This is an incomplete list of Statutory Instruments of the United Kingdom in 1999.

1-100

 The School Standards and Framework Act 1998 (School Playing Fields) (Modification) (England) Regulations 1999 (S.I. 1999 No. 1)
 The Education (School Premises) Regulations 1999 (S.I. 1999 No. 2)
 The Social Security (Categorisation of Earners) Amendment Regulations 1999 (S.I. 1999 No. 3)
 The Medicines (Standard Provisions for Licences and Certificates) Amendment Regulations 1999 (S.I. 1999 No. 4)
 The Knives Act 1997 (Commencement) (No. 2) Order 1999 (S.I. 1999 No. 5 (C.1))
 The Rent Acts (Maximum Fair Rent) Order 1999 (S.I. 1999 No. 6)
 The Arable Area Payments (Amendment) Regulations 1999 (S.I. 1999 No. 8)
 The Curfew Condition (Responsible Officer) Order 1999 (S.I. 1999 No. 9)
 The Curfew Order (Responsible Officer)(Amendment) Order 1999 (S.I. 1999 No. 10)
 The Medway National Health Service Trust (Establishment) Amendment Order 1999 (S.I. 1999 No. 11)
 The A40 Trunk Road (Ealing) Red Route (Clearway) Traffic Order 1995 Variation Order 1999 (S.I. 1999 No. 12)
 The A40 Trunk Road (Ealing) Red Route Traffic Order 1995 Variation Order 1999 (S.I. 1999 No. 13)
 The Education (Infant Class Sizes) (Grant) Regulations 1999 (S.I. 1999 No. 14)
 The A205 Trunk Road (Southwark) Red Route (Bus Lanes) Traffic Order 1999 (S.I. 1999 No. 15)
 The Cambuslang College (Change of Name) (Scotland) Order 1999 (S.I. 1999 No. 16 (S. 1))
 The Merchant Shipping (Pilot Transfer Arrangements) Regulations 1999 (S.I. 1999 No. 17)
 The Vehicle Excise Duty (Immobilisation, Removal and Disposal of Vehicles) (Amendment) Regulations 1999 (S.I. 1999 No. 35)
 The Health and Safety at Work etc. Act 1974 (Application to Environmentally Hazardous Substances) (Amendment) Regulations 1999 (S.I. 1999 No. 40)
 The Portsmouth Harbour (Gunwharf Quays) Order 1999 (S.I. 1999 No. 50)
 The Warrington Hospital National Health Service Trust (Establishment) Amendment Order 1999 (S.I. 1999 No. 58)
 The Durham County Priority Services National Health Service Trust (Change of Name) Order 1999 (S.I. 1999 No. 60)
 The Government of Wales Act 1998 (Housing) (Amendments) Order 1999 (S.I. 1999 No. 61)
 The Sandwell Healthcare National Health Service Trust(Establishment) Amendment Order 1999 (S.I. 1999 No. 62)
 The Export of Goods (Control) (Amendment) Order 1999 (S.I. 1999 No. 63)
 The European Communities (Recognition of Professional Qualifications) (Second General System) (Amendment) Regulations 1999 (S.I. 1999 No. 67)
 The Housing Renewal Grants (Common Parts) Order 1999 (S.I. 1999 No. 68)
 The General Optical Council (Registration and Enrolment (Amendment) Rules)—Order of Council 1999 (S.I. 1999 No. 69)
 The Income Tax (Employments) (Amendment) Regulations 1999 (S.I. 1999 No. 70)
 The Allocation of Housing and Homelessness (Review Procedures) Regulations 1999 (S.I. 1999 No. 71)
 Motor Vehicles (Driving Licences) (Amendment) Regulations 1999 (S.I. 1999 No. 72)
 The Charities (Seamen's Hospital Society) Order 1999 (S.I. 1999 No. 73)
 The Sea Fish (Specified Sea Area) (Regulation of Nets and Prohibition of Fishing Methods) (Variation) Order 1999 (S.I. 1999 No. 74)
 The Bass (Specified Areas) (Prohibition of Fishing) (Variation) Order 1999 (S.I. 1999 No. 75)
 The Building Regulations (Amendment) Regulations 1999 (S.I. 1999 No. 77)
 Act of Adjournal (Criminal Procedure Rules) (Amendment) 1999 (S.I. 1999 No. 78 (S.2))
 The Grants for Pre-school Education (Prescribed Children) (Scotland) Amendment Order 1999 (S.I. 1999 No. 79 (S.3))
 The Food Protection (Emergency Prohibitions) (Radioactivity in Sheep) Partial Revocation Order 1999 (S.I. 1999 No. 80)
 The A205 Trunk Road (Lewisham) Red Route Traffic Order 1999 (S.I. 1999 No. 81)

101-200

 The Financing of Maintained Schools Regulations 1999 (S.I. 1999 No. 101)
 The Local Government Act 1988 (Defined Activities) (Exemption) (Enfield London Borough Council) Order 1999 (S.I. 1999 No. 102)
 The Orkney Islands (Electoral Arrangements) Order 1999 (S.I. 1999 No. 103 (S.4))
 The Shetland Islands (Electoral Arrangements) Order 1999 (S.I. 1999 No. 104 (S.5))
 The Channel Tunnel Rail Link (Assessment of Environmental Effects) Regulations 1999 (S.I. 1999 No. 107)
 The Government of Wales Act 1998 (Commencement No. 3) Order 1999 (S.I. 1999 No. 118 (C.2))
 The School Standards and Framework Act 1998 (Commencement No. 5 and Saving and Transitional Provisions) Order 1999 (S.I. 1999 No. 120 (C.3))
 The Broadcasting (Restrictions on the Holding of Licences) (Amendment) Order 1999 (S.I. 1999 No. 122)
 The Income Support (General) (Standard Interest Rate Amendment) Regulations 1999 (S.I. 1999 No. 123)
 The Education (Relevant Areas for Consultation on Admission Arrangements) Regulations 1999 (S.I. 1999 No. 124)
 The Education (Objections to Admission Arrangements) Regulations 1999 (S.I. 1999 No. 125)
 The Education (Determination of Admission Arrangements) Regulations 1999 (S.I. 1999 No. 126)
 The Education (School Information) (Wales) (Amendment) Regulations 1999 (S.I. 1999 No. 127)
 The Land Registration Rules 1999 (S.I. 1999 No. 128)
 The School Standards and Framework Act 1998 (School Attendance Targets) (Modification) Regulations 1999 (S.I. 1999 No. 129)
 The Road Traffic (Permitted Parking Area and Special Parking Area) (County of Kent) (Borough of Maidstone) (Amendment) Order 1999 (S.I. 1999 No. 130)
 The Road Traffic (Permitted Parking Area and Special Parking Area) (City of Manchester) Order 1999 (S.I. 1999 No. 131)
 The Road Traffic (Permitted Parking Area and Special Parking Area) (County of Hampshire) (City of Winchester) (Amendment) Order 1999 (S.I. 1999 No. 132)
 The National Lottery (Imposition of Penalties and Revocation of Licences) Procedure Regulations 1999 (S.I. 1999 No. 137)
 The Education Development Plans (England) Regulations 1999 (S.I. 1999 No. 138)
 The A205 Trunk Road (Southwark) Red Route (Prohibited Turns) Traffic Order 1999 (S.I. 1999 No. 142)
 The A1 Trunk Road (Haringey) Red Route Traffic Order 1993 Variation Order 1999 (S.I. 1999 No. 143)
 The Restriction of Liberty Order (Scotland) Amendment Regulations 1999 (S.I. 1999 No. 144 (S. 6))
 The Police Act 1997 (Commencement No. 6) Order 1999 (S.I. 1999 No. 151 (C.4))
 The Magistrates' Courts Committees (West Yorkshire) Amalgamation (Amendment) Order 1999 (S.I. 1999 No. 152)
 The Tameside (Parishes) Order 1999 (S.I. 1999 No. 156)
 The Miscellaneous Products of Animal Origin (Import Conditions) Regulations 1999 (S.I. 1999 No. 157)
 The Industrial Training Levy (Engineering Construction Board) Order 1999 (S.I. 1999 No. 158)
 The Industrial Training Levy (Construction Board) Order 1999 (S.I. 1999 No. 159)
 The Petroleum (Current Model Clauses) Order 1999 (S.I. 1999 No. 160)
 The Petroleum Act 1998 (Commencement No. 1) Order 1999 (S.I. 1999 No. 161 (C. 5))
 The Road Traffic Offenders (Prescribed Devices) Order 1999 (S.I. 1999 No. 162)
 The Midland Metro (Penalty Fares) (Activating) Order 1999 (S.I. 1999 No. 163)
 The Housing Revenue Account General Fund Contribution Limits (Scotland) Order 1999 (S.I. 1999 No. 164 (S.7))
 The Legal Aid (Prescribed Panels) Regulations 1999 (S.I. 1999 No. 166)
 The M4 Motorway (Hillingdon and Hounslow) (Speed Limits) (Amendment) Regulations 1999 (S.I. 1999 No. 167)
 The Protection of Wrecks (Designation) Order 1999 (S.I. 1999 No. 186 (S.8))
 Act of Sederunt (Rules of the Court of Session Amendment) (Witnesses' Fees) 1999 (S.I. 1999 No. 187 (S.9))
 Act of Sederunt (Fees of Witnesses in the Sheriff Court) (Amendment) 1999 (S.I. 1999 No. 188 (S.10))
 The Guaranteed Minimum Pensions Increase Order 1999 (S.I. 1999 No. 192)
 The Chemicals (Hazard Information and Packaging for Supply) (Amendment) Regulations 1999 (S.I. 1999 No. 197)
 The Child Benefit (Residence and Persons Abroad) Amendment Regulations 1999 (S.I. 1999 No. 198)
 The Mid-Sussex National Health Service Trust (Establishment) Amendment Order 1999 (S.I. 1999 No. 199)

201-300

 The Advice and Assistance (Assistance by Way of Representation) (Scotland) Amendment Regulations 1999 (S.I. 1999 No. 214 (S. 11))
 The Criminal Legal Aid (Scotland) (Prescribed Proceedings) Amendment Regulations 1999 (S.I. 1999 No. 215 (S. 12))
 The Civil Courts (Amendment) Order 1999 (S.I. 1999 No. 216)
 The Greater Manchester (Light Rapid Transit System) (Airport Extension Order 1997) (Moor Road Modification) Order 1999 (S.I. 1999 No. 217)
 The York Sixth Form College (Dissolution) Order 1999 (S.I. 1999 No. 218)
 The Local Government Act 1988 (Defined Activities) (Exemptions) (Broxtowe Borough Council, South Somerset District Council and Thurrock Borough Council) Order 1999 (S.I. 1999 No. 219)
 The National Institute for Clinical Excellence (Establishment and Constitution) Order 1999 (S.I. 1999 No. 220)
 The Water (Compulsory Works Powers) (Notice) Regulations 1999 (S.I. 1999 No. 221)
 The Local Authorities (Alteration of Requisite Calculations) (England) Regulations 1999 (S.I. 1999 No. 228)
 The Local Education Authority (Post-Compulsory Education Awards) Regulations 1999 (S.I. 1999 No. 229)
 The Fishguard to Bangor Trunk Road (A487) (Llanwnda to South of Llanllyfni Improvement) Order 1999 (S.I. 1999 No. 230)
 The A4 Trunk Road (Bath Road and Sipson Way, Hillingdon) (Prohibition of Traffic Movements) Order 1999 (S.I. 1999 No. 232)
 The A4 Trunk Road (Bath Road, Hillingdon) (Bus Lane) Order 1999 (S.I. 1999 No. 233)
 The A4 Trunk Road (Bath Road and Sipson Road, Hillingdon) (Prohibition of Turns) Order 1999 (S.I. 1999 No. 234)
 The A4 Trunk Road (Bath Road and North Hatton Road, Hillingdon) (Left Turn Lane) Order 1999 (S.I. 1999 No. 235)
 The Building Societies (Contents of Accounts) Regulations 1999 (S.I. 1999 No. 248)
 The Education (School Information) (England) (Amendment) Regulations 1999 (S.I. 1999 No. 251)
 The Education (Grants for Education Support and Training) (England) Regulations 1998 (Amendment) Regulations 1999 (S.I. 1999 No. 252)
 The Non-Domestic Rate (Scotland) Order 1999 (S.I. 1999 No. 254 (S. 13))
 The Transport of Dangerous Goods (Safety Advisers) Regulations 1999 (S.I. 1999 No. 257)
 The Education (Aptitude for Particular Subjects) Regulations 1999 (S.I. 1999 No. 258)
 The Local Government Changes for England (Council Tax) (Transitional Reduction) Regulations 1999 (S.I. 1999 No. 259)
 The National Institute for Clinical Excellence Regulations 1999 (S.I. 1999 No. 260)
 The National Health Service (Fund-holding Practices) Amendment Regulations 1999 (S.I. 1999 No. 261)
 The Personal Injuries (Civilians) Amendment Scheme 1999 (S.I. 1999 No. 262)
 The Social Security (Contributions) (Re-rating and National Insurance Fund Payments) Order 1999 (S.I. 1999 No. 263)
 The Social Security Benefits Up-rating Order 1999 (S.I. 1999 No. 264)
 The Education (Registered Inspectors of Schools Appeal Tribunal and Registered Nursery Education Inspectors Appeal Tribunal) (Procedure) Regulations 1999 (S.I. 1999 No. 265)
 The Langstone Harbour Revision Order 1999 (S.I. 1999 No. 266)
 The Medicines (Advertising and Monitoring of Advertising) Amendment Regulations 1999 (S.I. 1999 No. 267)
 The European Economic Interest Grouping (Fees) Regulations 1999 (S.I. 1999 No. 268)
 The Police (Retention and Disposal of Items seized under section 60 of the Criminal Justice and Public Order Act 1994) Regulations 1999 (S.I. 1999 No. 269)
 The Scottish Parliament (Regional Returning Officers) (Scotland) Order 1999 (S.I. 1999 No. 270 (S. 14))
 The Civil Aviation (Canadian Navigation Services) (Amendment) Regulations 1999 (S.I. 1999 No. 271)
 The Trunk Roads (Red Route) Traffic Orders (General Variation) Order 1999 (S.I. 1999 No. 272)
 The A1 Trunk Road (Islington) Red Route Traffic Order 1993 Variation Order 1999 (S.I. 1999 No. 273)
 The Education Act 1996 (Special Purpose and Capital Grants) (Modification) Regulations 1999 (S.I. 1999 No. 274)
 The Processed Cereal-based Foods and Baby Foods for Infants and Young Children (Amendment) Regulations 1999 (S.I. 1999 No. 275)
 The Non-Domestic Rates (Levying) (Scotland) Regulations 1999 (S.I. 1999 No. 276 (S. 15))
 The Parliamentary Commissioner Order 1999 (S.I. 1999 No. 277)
 The European Communities (Immunities and Privileges of the North-East Atlantic Fisheries Commission) Order 1999 (S.I. 1999 No. 278)
 The European Communities (Definition of Treaties) (North-East Atlantic Fisheries Commission) Order 1999 (S.I. 1999 No. 279)
 The Federal Republic of Yugoslavia (United Nations Sanctions) (Amendment) Order 1999 (S.I. 1999 No. 280)
 The Federal Republic of Yugoslavia (United Nations Sanctions) (Dependent Territories) (Amendment) Order 1999 (S.I. 1999 No. 281)
 The Criminal Justice Act 1988 (Designated Countries and Territories) (Amendment) Order 1999 (S.I. 1999 No. 282)
 The Departments (Northern Ireland) Order 1999 (S.I. 1999 No. 283 (N.I. 1))
 The Federal Republic of Yugoslavia (United Nations Sanctions) (Channel Islands) (Amendment) Order 1999 (S.I. 1999 No. 284)
 The Federal Republic of Yugoslavia (United Nations Sanctions) (Isle of Man) (Amendment) Order 1999 (S.I. 1999 No. 285)
 The Employer's Contributions Re-imbursement Amendment Regulations 1999 (S.I. 1999 No. 286)
 The Confirmation to Small Estates (Scotland) Order 1999 (S.I. 1999 No. 290 (S. 16))
 The Police and Criminal Evidence Act 1984 (Codes of Practice No. 5) Order 1999 (S.I. 1999 No. 291)
 The Housing (Right to Buy) (Limits on Discount) (Wales) Order 1999 (S.I. 1999 No. 292)
 The Town and Country Planning (Environmental Impact Assessment) (England and Wales) Regulations 1999 (S.I. 1999 No. 293)
 The Naval, Military and Air Forces Etc. (Disablement and Death) Service Pensions Amendment Order 1999 (S.I. 1999 No. 294)
 The Local Authorities (Alteration of Requisite Calculations) (Wales) Regulations 1999 (S.I. 1999 No. 296)
 The Local Authorities (Requisite Calculations) (Wales) (Prescribed Amounts) Regulations 1999 (S.I. 1999 No. 297)

301-400

 The Carriage of Dangerous Goods (Amendment) Regulations 1999 (S.I. 1999 No. 303)
 The Local Government Act 1988 (Defined Activities) (Exemption) (Stoke-on-Trent City Council) Order 1999 (S.I. 1999 No. 315)
 The National Health Service (General Medical Services) Amendment Regulations 1999 (S.I. 1999 No. 326)
 The Town and Country Planning (Costs of Inquiries etc.) (Standard Daily Amount) Regulations 1999 (S.I. 1999 No. 327)
 The Export of Goods (Control) (Amendment No. 2) Order 1999 (S.I. 1999 No. 335)
 The Merchant Shipping (Carriage of Cargoes) Regulations 1999 (S.I. 1999 No. 336)
 The Self-Governing Schools (Publication of Proposals for Discontinuance) (Scotland) Regulations 1999 (S.I. 1999 No. 337 (S.17))
 The Northern Ireland Act 1998 (Commencement No. 1) Order 1999 (S.I. 1999 No. 340 (C. 6))
 The Social Security Benefits Up-rating (No. 2) Order 1999 (S.I. 1999 No. 341)
 The A20 Trunk Road (Greenwich) Red Route Traffic Order 1996 Variation Order 1999 (S.I. 1999 No. 342)
 The A102 Trunk Road (Greenwich) Red Route (Clearway) Traffic Order 1999 (S.I. 1999 No. 343)
 The Apportionment of Money in the National Lottery Distribution Fund Order 1999 (S.I. 1999 No. 344)
 The Legal Aid in Criminal and Care Proceedings (Costs) (Amendment) Regulations 1999 (S.I. 1999 No. 345)
 The Legal Aid in Criminal and Care Proceedings (General) (Amendment) Regulations 1999 (S.I. 1999 No. 346)
 The Council Tax Reduction Scheme (Wales) Regulations 1999 (S.I. 1999 No. 347)
 The Council Tax (Demand Notices) (Wales) (Transitional Provisions) Regulations 1999 (S.I. 1999 No. 348)
 The Motor Cars (Driving Instruction) (Admission of Community Licence Holders) Regulations 1999 (S.I. 1999 No. 357)
 The Corporation Tax (Treatment of Unrelieved Surplus Advance Corporation Tax) Regulations 1999 (S.I. 1999 No. 358)
 The Insolvency (Amendment) Rules 1999 (S.I. 1999 No. 359)
 The Offshore Petroleum Production and Pipe-lines (Assessment of Environmental Effects) Regulations 1999 (S.I. 1999 No. 360)
 The Social Security (Contributions) (Re-rating) Consequential Amendment Regulations 1999 (S.I. 1999 No. 361)
 The Education (Transition to New Framework) (New Schools, Groups and Miscellaneous) Regulations 1999 (S.I. 1999 No. 362)
 The Statutory Maternity Pay (Compensation of Employers) Amendment Regulations 1999 (S.I. 1999 No. 363)
 The Local Government Finance (Scotland) Order 1999 (S.I. 1999 No. 364 (S. 18))
 The National Health Service (Fund-Holding Practices) (Scotland) Amendment Regulations 1999 (S.I. 1999 No. 365 (S. 19))
 The Highland Communities National Health Service Trust (Establishment) Amendment Order 1999 (S.I. 1999 No. 366 (S. 20))
 The Environmental Impact Assessment (Fish Farming in Marine Waters) Regulations 1999 (S.I. 1999 No.367)
 The Highways (Assessment of Environmental Effects) Regulations 1999 (S.I. 1999 No. 369)
 The Birmingham Children's Hospital National Health Service Trust (Establishment) Amendment Order 1999 (S.I. 1999 No. 370)
 The Income Support (General) (Standard Interest Rate Amendment) (No. 2) Regulations 1999 (S.I. 1999 No. 371)
 The Land Authority for Wales (Abolition) Order 1999 (S.I. 1999 No. 372)
 The Development Board for Rural Wales (Abolition) Order 1999 (S.I. 1999 No. 373)
 The Prisons and Young Offenders Institutions (Scotland) Amendment Rules 1999 (S.I. 1999 No. 374 (S. 21))
 The Hill Livestock (Compensatory Allowances) (Amendment) Regulations 1999 (S.I. 1999 No. 375)
 The River Tay Salmon Fishery District (Baits and Lures) Regulations 1999 (S.I. 1999 No. 376 (S. 22))
 The Channel Tunnel Rail Link (Nomination) Order 1999 (S.I. 1999 No. 391)
 The Hyde Park and The Regent's Park (Vehicle Parking) (Amendment) Regulations 1999 (S.I. 1999 No. 392)
 The Registration of Political Parties Act 1998 (Commencement) Order 1999 (S.I. 1999 No. 393 (C. 7))
 The Local Elections (Principal Areas) (Amendment) Rules 1999 (S.I. 1999 No. 394)
 The Local Elections (Parishes and Communities) (Amendment) Rules 1999 (S.I. 1999 No. 395)
 The Environmental Protection Act 1990 (Extension of Section 140) Regulations 1999 (S.I. 1999 No. 396)
 The Education (School Attendance Targets) (England) Regulations 1999 (S.I. 1999 No. 397)
 The Education (School Organisation Committees) (Initial Financial Arrangements) (England) Regulations 1999 (S.I. 1999 No. 398)
 The Food Safety (Fishery Products and Live Shellfish) (Hygiene) Amendment Regulations 1999 (S.I. 1999 No. 399)
 The Welfare of Animals (Slaughter or Killing) (Amendment) Regulations 1999 (S.I. 1999 No. 400)

401-500

 The Poole Harbour Revision Order 1999 (S.I. 1999 No. 403)
 The A23 Trunk Road (Croydon) Red Route Traffic Order 1999 (S.I. 1999 No. 414)
 The Sugar Beet (Research and Education) Order 1999 (S.I. 1999 No. 415)
 The Development Commission (Transfer of Functions and Miscellaneous Provisions) Order 1999 (S.I. 1999 No. 416)
 The Social Security Act 1998 (Commencement No. 3) Order 1999 (S.I. 1999 No. 418 (C.8))
 The Taxes (Interest Rate) (Amendment) Regulations 1999 (S.I. 1999 No. 419)
 The Public Lending Right Scheme 1982 (Commencement of Variations) Order 1999 (S.I. 1999 No. 420)
 The Local Authorities (Goods and Services) (Public Bodies) (No. 1) Order 1999 (S.I. 1999 No. 421)
 The Central Nottinghamshire Healthcare National Health Service Trust (Establishment) Amendment Order 1999 (S.I. 1999 No. 422)
 The Lifecare National Health Service Trust (Dissolution) Order 1999 (S.I. 1999 No. 423)
 The Sea Fishing (Enforcement of Community Quota Measures) Order 1999 (S.I. 1999 No. 424)
 The Third Country Fishing (Enforcement) Order 1999 (S.I. 1999 No. 425)
 The Lotteries (Gaming Board Fees) Order 1999 (S.I. 1999 No. 436)
 The Control of Substances Hazardous to Health Regulations 1999 (S.I. 1999 No. 437)
 The Value Added Tax (Amendment) Regulations 1999 (S.I. 1999 No. 438)
 The Electricity (Non-Fossil Fuel Sources) (Scotland) Order 1999 (S.I. 1999 No. 439 (S. 24))
 The Education (Grant-maintained Schools) (Capital Grants) (Wales) Regulations 1999 (S.I. 1999 No. 440)
 The Scotland Act 1998 (Transitory and Transitional Provisions) (Finance) Order 1999 (S.I. 1999 No. 441 (S. 25))
 The St. Andrew's College of Education (Closure) (Scotland) Order 1999 (S.I. 1999 No. 442 (S. 26))
 The National Health Service Superannuation Scheme (Scotland) Amendment Regulations 1999 (S.I. 1999 No. 443 (S. 27))
 The National Health Service (Scotland) (Injury Benefits) Amendment Regulations 1999 (S.I. 1999 No. 444 (S. 28))
 The Prior Rights of Surviving Spouse (Scotland) Order 1999 (S.I. 1999 No. 445 (S. 29))
 The Teachers' Superannuation (Scotland) Amendment Regulations 1999 (S.I. 1999 No. 446 (S. 30))
 The Education (Grants for Education Support and Training) (England) Regulations 1998 (Amendment No. 2) Regulations 1999 (S.I. 1999 No. 447)
 The Landmines Act 1998 (Commencement) Order 1999 (S.I. 1999 No. 448 (C.15))
 The National Assembly for Wales (Disqualification) Order 1999 (S.I. 1999 No. 449)
 The National Assembly for Wales (Representation of the People) Order 1999 (S.I. 1999 No. 450)
 The Education (Budget Statements) (Wales) Regulations 1999 (S.I. 1999 No. 451)
 The Local Government Act 1988 (Defined Activities) (Exemptions) (Havering London Borough Council and Scarborough Borough Council) Order 1999 (S.I. 1999 No. 452)
 The Local Authorities (Capital Finance) (Rate of Discount for 1999/2000) Regulations 1999 (S.I. 1999 No. 453)
 The Northern Ireland Arms Decommissioning Act 1997 (Amnesty Period) Order 1999 (S.I. 1999 No. 454)
 The Waste Management Licences (Consultation and Compensation) Regulations 1999 (S.I. 1999 No. 481)
 The Common Agricultural Policy (Wine) (Amendment) Regulations 1999 (S.I. 1999 No. 482)
 The Crime and Disorder Strategies (Prescribed Descriptions) (Amendment) Order 1999 (S.I. 1999 No. 483)
 The River Tay Estuary Limits Order 1999 (S.I. 1999 No. 484 (S. 31))
 The Education (Budget Statements and Supplementary Provisions) Regulations 1999 (S.I. 1999 No. 486)
 The A1 Trunk Road (Tempsford Junction Improvements Slip Roads) Order 1999 (S.I. 1999 No. 487)
 The A57 Trunk Road (Swallownest Roundabout to M1 Junction 31) (Detrunking) Order 1999 (S.I. 1999 No. 488)
 The A638 Trunk Road (B6273 Garmil Lane West of Wragby to King Royd Lane, Brackenhill Common, Ackworth) (Detrunking) Order 1999 (S.I. 1999 No. 489)
 The Removal and Disposal of Vehicles (Amendment) (Scotland) Regulations 1999 (S.I. 1999 No. 490 (S. 32))
 The Criminal Legal Aid (Fixed Payments) (Scotland) Regulations 1999 (S.I. 1999 No. 491 (S. 33))
 The Scottish Local Elections Amendment (No.2) Rules 1999 (S.I. 1999 No. 492 (S. 34))
 The Education (Amount to Follow Permanently Excluded Pupil) Regulations 1999 (S.I. 1999 No. 495)
 The Education (Student Support) Regulations 1999 (S.I. 1999 No. 496)
 The Amalgamation of the Hilgay Great West Fen and Southery and District Internal Drainage Districts Order 1998 (S.I. 1999 No. 497)
 The Insurance Companies (Capital Redemption Business) (Modification of the Corporation Tax Acts) Regulations 1999 (S.I. 1999 No. 498)
 The Education (School Organisation Plans) (Wales) Regulations 1999 (S.I. 1999 No. 499)
 The Local Government (Committees and Political Groups) (Amendment) Regulations 1999 (S.I. 1999 No. 500)

501-600

 The Local Authorities (Capital Finance) (Amendment) Regulations 1999 (S.I. 1999 No. 501)
 The Local Government (Discretionary Payments) (Amendment) Regulations 1999 (S.I. 1999 No. 502)
 The Deregulation (Weights and Measures) Order 1999 (S.I. 1999 No. 503)
 The Weights and Measures (Prescribed Stamp) (Amendment) Regulations 1999 (S.I. 1999 No. 504)
 The Competition Act 1998 (Commencement No. 3) Order 1999 (S.I. 1999 No. 505 (C. 9))
 The Competition Act 1998 (Competition Commission) Transitional, Consequential and Supplemental Provisions Order 1999 (S.I. 1999 No. 506)
 The Superannuation (Application of the Superannuation Act 1972, Section 1) Order 1999 (S.I. 1999 No. 519)
 The Rail Vehicle Accessibility (Midland Metro T69 Vehicles) Exemption Order 1999 (S.I. 1999 No. 520)
 The Education (Education Standards Grants) (Wales) Regulations 1999 (S.I. 1999 No. 521)
 The Pensions Increase (Review) Order 1999 (S.I. 1999 No. 522)
 The Magistrates' Courts Committees (Hampshire and Isle of Wight) Amalgamation Order 1999 (S.I. 1999 No. 523)
 The Children (Allocation of Proceedings) (Amendment) Order 1999 (S.I. 1999 No. 524)
 The Northern Ireland (Emergency Provisions) Act 1996 (Amendment) Order 1999 (S.I. 1999 No. 525)
 The Social Security Act 1998 (Commencement No.4) Order 1999 (S.I. 1999 No. 526 (C.10))
 The Social Security Contributions (Transfer of Functions, etc.) Act 1999 (Commencement No. 1 and Transitional Provisions) Order 1999 (S.I. 1999 No. 527 (C.11))
 The Social Security Act 1998 (Commencement No. 5) Order 1999 (S.I. 1999 No. 528 (C.12))
 The Social Security (Industrial Injuries) (Dependency) (Permitted Earnings Limits) Order 1999 (S.I. 1999 No. 529)
 The Jobseeker's Allowance (Amendment) Regulations 1999 (S.I. 1999 No. 530)
 The School Standards and Framework Act 1998 (Appointed Day) Order 1999 (S.I. 1999 No. 531 (C. 13))
 The Education (Schedule 32 to the School Standards and Framework Act 1998) (England) Regulations 1999 (S.I. 1999 No. 532)
 The Police Act 1996 (Commencement and Transitional Provisions) Order 1999 (S.I. 1999 No. 533 (C. 14))
 The Council Tax (Administration and Enforcement) (Amendment) Regulations 1999 (S.I. 1999 No. 534)
 The Motor Cycles (Eye Protectors) Regulations 1999 (S.I. 1999 No. 535)
 The Council Tax (Exempt Dwellings) (Amendment) Order 1999 (S.I. 1999 No. 536)
 The Channel Tunnel Rail Link (Boarley Lane Diversion) Order 1999 (S.I. 1999 No. 537)
 The Specified Risk Material (Inspection Charges) Regulations 1999 (S.I. 1999 No. 539)
 The Spreadable Fats (Marketing Standards) (Amendment) Regulations 1999 (S.I. 1999 No. 540)
 The Police (Secretary of State's Objectives) Order 1999 (S.I. 1999 No. 543)
 The National Health Service (Dental Charges) Amendment Regulations 1999 (S.I. 1999 No. 544)
 The Local Government (Parishes and Parish Councils) Regulations 1999 (S.I. 1999 No. 545)
 The Environmental Protection (Waste Recycling Payments) (Amendment) Regulations 1999 (S.I. 1999 No. 546)
 The Offshore Installations (Safety Zones) Order 1999 (S.I. 1999 No. 547)
 The National Assistance (Sums for Personal Requirements) Regulations 1999 (S.I. 1999 No. 549)
 The Income-related Benefits (Subsidy to Authorities) Amendment Order 1999 (S.I. 1999 No. 550)
 The Common Investment (Amendment) Scheme 1999 (S.I. 1999 No. 551 (L. 1))
 The A41 Trunk Road (Barnet) Red Route (Prohibited Turn) Experimental Traffic Order 1999 (S.I. 1999 No. 552)
 The A1 Trunk Road (Barnet and Haringey) Red Route Experimental Traffic Order 1999 (S.I. 1999 No. 553)
 The Public Airport Companies (Capital Finance) (Amendment) Order 1999 (S.I. 1999 No. 554)
 The A1 Trunk Road (Barnet and Haringey) Red Route (Clearway) Experimental Traffic Order 1999 (S.I. 1999 No. 555)
 The Social Security (Contributions) Amendment Regulations 1999 (S.I. 1999 No. 561)
 The Finance Act 1993, Section 86(2), (Fish Quota) Order 1999 (S.I. 1999 No. 564)
 The Medicines for Human Use and Medical Devices (Fees and Miscellaneous Amendments) Regulations 1999 (S.I. 1999 No. 566)
 The Social Security Contributions, Statutory Maternity Pay and Statutory Sick Pay (Miscellaneous Amendments) Regulations 1999 (S.I. 1999 No. 567)
 The Social Security (Contributions and Credits) (Miscellaneous Amendments) Regulations 1999 (S.I. 1999 No. 568)
 The National Minimum Wage Act 1998 (Amendment) Regulations 1999 (S.I. 1999 No. 583)
 The National Minimum Wage Regulations 1999 (S.I. 1999 No. 584)
 The Rail Vehicle Accessibility (Midland Metro T69 Vehicles) Exemption (Amendment) Order 1999 (S.I. 1999 No. 586)
 The National Savings Bank (Amendment) Regulations 1999 (S.I. 1999 No. 588)
 The Insurance (Fees) Regulations 1999 (S.I. 1999 No. 589)
 The Organic Farming Regulations 1999 (S.I. 1999 No. 590)
 The Capital Gains Tax (Annual Exempt Amount) Order 1999 (S.I. 1999 No. 591)
 The Retirement Benefits Schemes (Indexation of Earnings Cap) Order 1999 (S.I. 1999 No. 592)
 The Value Added Tax (Buildings and Land) Order 1999 (S.I. 1999 No. 593)
 The Value Added Tax (Finance) Order 1999 (S.I. 1999 No. 594)
 The Value Added Tax (Increase of Registration Limits) Order 1999 (S.I. 1999 No. 595 )
 The Inheritance Tax (Indexation) Order 1999 (S.I. 1999 No. 596)
 The Income Tax (Indexation) Order 1999 (S.I. 1999 No. 597)
 The Crown Court (Miscellaneous Amendments) Rules 1999 (S.I. 1999 No. 598 (L. 2))
 The Value Added Tax (Amendment) (No. 2) Regulations 1999 (S.I. 1999 No. 599)
 The Education Act 1996 (Grant-Maintained Schools) (Grants to Governing Bodies in Liquidation) (Modification) Regulations 1999 (S.I. 1999 No. 600)

601-700

 The Education (School Inspection) (Amendment) Regulations 1999 (S.I. 1999 No. 601)
 The High Pavement Sixth Form College, Nottingham (Dissolution) Order 1999 (S.I. 1999 No. 602)
 The Education (Fees at Higher Education Institutions) Regulations 1999 (S.I. 1999 No. 603)
 The Education (Transfer of Functions Concerning School Lunches) (England) Order 1999 (S.I. 1999 No. 604)
 The Education (Post 16 Partnership Grant) (England) Regulations 1999 (S.I. 1999 No. 605)
 The Education (Education Standards Etc. Grants) (England) Regulations 1999 (S.I. 1999 No. 606)
 The Teachers' Pensions (Amendment) Regulations 1999 (S.I. 1999 No. 607)
 The Teachers (Compensation for Redundancy and Premature Retirement) (Amendment) Regulations 1999 (S.I. 1999 No. 608)
 The National Health Service (Optical Charges and Payments) Amendment Regulations 1999 (S.I. 1999 No. 609)
 The Education (Transfer of Functions Concerning School Lunches) (Wales) Order 1999 (S.I. 1999 No. 610)
 The Housing (Right to Buy) (Cost Floor) (Scotland) Order 1999 (S.I. 1999 No. 611 (S. 35))
 The National Health Service (Charges for Drugs and Appliances) (Scotland) Amendment Regulations 1999 (S.I. 1999 No. 612 (S. 36))
 Act of Sederunt (Fees of Shorthand Writers in the Sheriff Court) (Amendment) 1999 (S.I. 1999 No. 613 (S.37))
 The Local Authorities' Traffic Orders (Procedure) (Scotland) Regulations 1999 (S.I. 1999 No. 614 (S. 38))
 Act of Sederunt (Rules of the Court of Session Amendment No. 2) (Fees of Shorthand Writers) 1999 (S.I. 1999 No. 615 (S.39))
 The Health Authorities (England) Establishment Order 1996 Amendment and the Cambridgeshire and Norfolk Health Authorities (Establishment etc.) Order 1999 (S.I. 1999 No. 616)
 The Motor Vehicles (Driving Licences) (Amendment) (No. 2) Regulations 1999 (S.I. 1999 No. 617)
 The Civil Aviation (Navigation Services Charges) (Second Amendment) Regulations 1999 (S.I. 1999 No. 618)
 The Finance Act 1998, Section 37, (Appointed Day) Order 1999 (S.I. 1999 No. 619 (C. 16))
 The Gilt-edged Securities (Periodic Accounting for Tax on Interest) (Amendment) Regulations 1999 (S.I. 1999 No. 620)
 The Manufactured Dividends (Tax) (Amendment) Regulations 1999 (S.I. 1999 No. 621)
 The Friendly Societies (Provisional Repayments for Exempt Business) Regulations 1999 (S.I. 1999 No. 622)
 The Insurance Companies (Gilt-edged Securities) (Periodic Accounting for Tax on Interest) Regulations 1999 (S.I. 1999 No. 623)
 The Friendly Societies (Gilt-edged Securities) (Periodic Accounting for Tax on Interest) Regulations 1999 (S.I. 1999 No. 624)
 The North Bristol National Health Service Trust (Establishment) Order 1999 (S.I. 1999 No. 625)
 The Frenchay Healthcare and the Southmead Health Services National Health Service Trusts (Dissolution) Order 1999 (S.I. 1999 No. 626)
 The Northumbria Health Care National Health Service Trust (Transfer of Trust Property) Order 1999 (S.I. 1999 No. 627)
 The National Health Service (Functions of Health Authorities and Administration Arrangements) Amendment Regulations 1999 (S.I. 1999 No. 628)
 The Swindon and Marlborough National Health Service Trust (Establishment) Amendment Order 1999 (S.I. 1999 No. 630)
 The Mancunian Community Health National Health Service Trust (Establishment) Amendment Order 1999 (S.I. 1999 No. 631)
 The St. Helens and Knowsley Hospital Services National Health Service Trust (Establishment) Amendment Order 1999 (S.I. 1999 No. 632)
 The Cornwall Healthcare National Health Service Trust (Establishment) Amendment Order 1999 (S.I. 1999 No. 633)
 The Trecare National Health Service Trust (Dissolution) Order 1999 (S.I. 1999 No. 634)
 The Lincoln District Healthcare National Health Service Trust (Establishment) Amendment Order 1999 (S.I. 1999 No. 636)
 The West Lindsey National Health Service Trust (Dissolution) Order 1999 (S.I. 1999 No. 637)
 The School Standards and Framework Act 1998 (Modification, Transitional and Consequential Provisions) Regulations 1999 (S.I. 1999 No. 638)
 The Road Traffic (Permitted Parking Area and Special Parking Area) (County of Kent) (Borough of Maidstone) (Amendment) (No. 2) Order 1999 (S.I. 1999 No. 639)
 The North Staffordshire Combined Healthcare National Health Service Trust (Establishment) Amendment Order 1999 (S.I. 1999 No. 640)
 The National Health Service Estate Management and Health Building Agency Trading Fund Order 1999 (S.I. 1999 No. 641)
 The Housing Benefit (Permitted Totals) (Amendment) Order 1999 (S.I. 1999 No. 642)
 The Merchant Shipping (Cargo Ship Construction) (Amendment) Regulations 1999 (S.I. 1999 No. 643)
 The Medicines (Sale or Supply) (Miscellaneous Provisions) Amendment Regulations 1999 (S.I. 1999 No. 644)
 The Health and Safety (Fees) Regulations 1999 (S.I. 1999 No. 645)
 The Animal By-Products Order 1999 (S.I. 1999 No. 646)
 The Highlands and Islands Agricultural Programme Amendment Regulations 1999 (S.I. 1999 No. 647 (S. 40))
 The Planning and Compensation Act 1991 (Amendment of Schedule 18) Order 1999 (S.I. 1999 No. 648)
 The Food Protection (Emergency Prohibitions) (Paralytic Shellfish Poisoning) (No.2) Order 1998 Partial Revocation Order 1999 (S.I. 1999 No. 649)
 The National Lottery Act 1998 (Commencement) Order 1999 (S.I. 1999 No. 650 (C.17))
 The Rural Diversification Programme (Scotland) Amendment Regulations 1999 (S.I. 1999 No. 651 (S. 41))
 The Crime and Punishment (Scotland) Act 1997 (Commencement No. 5 and Transitional Provisions and Savings) Order 1999 (S.I. 1999 No. 652 (C. 18) (S. 42))
 The Scottish Ambulance Service National Health Service Trust (Dissolution) Order 1999 (S.I. 1999 No. 653 (S. 43))
 The European Communities (Designation) Order 1999 (S.I. 1999 No. 654)
 The Consular Fees Order 1999 (S.I. 1999 No. 655)
 The Corporation of the Cranleigh and Bramley Schools (Charter Amendments) Order 1999 (S.I. 1999 No. 656)
 The Education (Inspectors of Schools in Wales) Order 1999 (S.I. 1999 No. 657)
 The Appropriation (Northern Ireland) Order 1999 (S.I. 1999 No. 658 (N.I. 2))
 The Energy Efficiency (Northern Ireland) Order 1999 (S.I. 1999 No. 659 (N.I. 3))
 The Strategic Planning (Northern Ireland) Order 1999 (S.I. 1999 No. 660 (N.I. 4))
 The Trade Union Subscription Deductions (Northern Ireland) Order 1999 (S.I. 1999 No. 661 (N.I. 5))
 The Water (Northern Ireland) Order 1999 (S.I. 1999 No. 662 (N.I. 6))
 The Northern Ireland (Modification of Enactments—No. 1) Order 1999 (S.I. 1999 No. 663)
 The Northern Ireland (Royal Assent to Bills) Order 1999 (S.I. 1999 No. 664)
 The Judicial Committee (Devolution Issues) Rules Order 1999 (S.I. 1999 No. 665)
 The Hong Kong (Overseas Public Servants) (Pension Supplements) (Amendment) Order 1999 (S.I. 1999 No. 666)
 The Royal College of Physicians of London (Charter Amendment) Order 1999 (S.I. 1999 No. 667)
 The State Immunity (Merchant Shipping) (Revocation) Order 1999 (S.I. 1999 No. 668)
 The Environment Protection (Overseas Territories) (Amendment) Order 1999 (S.I. 1999 No. 669)
 The Diplomatic Privileges (British Nationals) Order 1999 (S.I. 1999 No. 670)
 The Social Security Contributions (Transfer of Functions, etc.) (Northern Ireland) Order 1999 (S.I. 1999 No. 671)
 The National Assembly for Wales (Transfer of Functions) Order 1999 (S.I. 1999 No. 672)
 The Confiscation of the Proceeds of Crime (Designated Countries and Territories) (Scotland) Order 1999 (S.I. 1999 No. 673 (S.44))
 The Scotland Act 1998 (Transitory and Transitional Provisions) (Appropriations) Order 1999 (S.I. 1999 No. 674 (S. 45))
 The Criminal Justice (International Co-operation) Act 1990 (Enforcement of Overseas Forfeiture Orders) (Scotland) Order 1999 (S.I. 1999 No. 675 (S.46))
 The Parliamentary Copyright (Scottish Parliament) Order 1999 (S.I. 1999 No. 676)
 The Scottish Parliamentary Corporate Body (Crown Status) Order 1999 (S.I. 1999 No. 677)
 The Transfer of Functions (Lord Advocate and Secretary of State) Order 1999 (S.I. 1999 No. 678)
 The Transfer of Functions (Lord Advocate and Advocate General for Scotland) Order 1999 (S.I. 1999 No. 679)
 The Scottish Parliament (Disqualification) Order 1999 (S.I. 1999 No. 680)
 The Magistrates' Courts (Hearsay Evidence in Civil Proceedings) Rules 1999 (S.I. 1999 No. 681 (L.3))
 The Occupational and Personal Pension Schemes (Levy) Amendment Regulations 1999 (S.I. 1999 No. 682)
 The Meat Products (Hygiene) (Amendment) Regulations 1999 (S.I. 1999 No. 683)
 The Income Tax (Cash Equivalents of Car Fuel Benefits) Order 1999 (S.I. 1999 No. 684)
 The National Minimum Wage Act 1998 (Commencement No. 2 and Transitional Provisions) Order 1999 (S.I. 1999 No. 685 (C. 19))
 The Scottish Ambulance Service Board Order 1999 (S.I. 1999 No. 686 (S. 47))
 The Supreme Court Fees Order 1999 (S.I. 1999 No. 687 (L. 4))
 The Non-Contentious Probate Fees Order 1999 (S.I. 1999 No. 688 (L. 5))
 The County Court Fees Order 1999 (S.I. 1999 No. 689 (L. 6))
 The Family Proceedings Fees Order 1999 (S.I. 1999 No. 690 (L. 7))
 The Public Record Office (Fees) Regulations 1999 (S.I. 1999 No. 691)
 The Crown Office Fees Order 1999 (S.I. 1999 No. 692)
 The National Health Service (General Ophthalmic Services) (Amendment) Regulations 1999 (S.I. 1999 No. 693)
 The National Health Service Information Authority Regulations 1999 (S.I. 1999 No. 694)
 The National Health Service Information Authority (Establishment and Constitution) Order 1999 (S.I. 1999 No. 695)
 The National Health Service (Pharmaceutical Services) Amendment Regulations 1999 (S.I. 1999 No. 696)
 The Calshot Oyster Fishery (Variation) Order 1999 (S.I. 1999 No. 697)
 The Education (Grant-maintained and Grant-maintained Special Schools) (Grants) (England) Regulations 1999 (S.I. 1999 No. 698)
 The Brackenhurst College, Southwell (Dissolution) Order 1999 (S.I. 1999 No. 699)
 The Education (School Organisation Committees) (England) Regulations 1999 (S.I. 1999 No. 700)

701-800

 The Education (School Organisation Plans) (England) Regulations 1999 (S.I. 1999 No. 701)
 The Education (References to Adjudicator) Regulations 1999 (S.I. 1999 No. 702)
 The Education (Governors' Allowances) Regulations 1999 (S.I. 1999 No. 703)
 The Education (Transition to New Framework) (School Organisation Proposals) Regulations 1999 (S.I. 1999 No. 704)
 Staffing of Grant-maintained and Grant-maintained Special Schools (Transitional Provisions) Regulations 1999 (S.I. 1999 No. 705)
 The East Durham and Houghall Community College (Incorporation) Order 1999 (S.I. 1999 No. 706)
 The East Durham and Houghall Community College (Government) Regulations 1999 (S.I. 1999 No. 707)
 The Leicester College (Incorporation) Order 1999 (S.I. 1999 No. 708)
 The Leicester College (Government) Regulations 1999 (S.I. 1999 No. 709)
 The Education (Payment for Special Educational Needs Supplies) Regulations 1999 (S.I. 1999 No. 710)
 The Education (References to Delegated Budgets and Revocation) Regulations 1999 (S.I. 1999 No. 711)
 The Agricultural Wages Act 1948 (Amendment) Regulations 1999 (S.I. 1999 No. 712)
 The Road Vehicles (Statutory Off-Road Notification) (Amendment) Regulations 1999 (S.I. 1999 No. 713)
 The Social Security Benefits (Miscellaneous Amendments) Regulations 1999 (S.I. 1999 No. 714)
 The Local Government Officers (Political Restrictions) (Amendment) Regulations 1999 (S.I. 1999 No. 715)
 The Criminal Procedure and Investigations Act 1996 (Commencement) (Section 67) Order 1999 (S.I. 1999 No. 716 (C.20))
 The European Parliamentary Elections Act 1999 (Commencement) Order 1999 (S.I. 1999 No. 717 (C. 21))
 The Criminal Procedure and Investigations Act 1996 (Appointed Day No.9) Order 1999 (S.I. 1999 No. 718 (C. 22))
 The Capital Allowances (Corresponding Northern Ireland Grants) Order 1999 (S.I. 1999 No. 719)
 The Workmen's Compensation (Supplementation) (Amendment) Scheme 1999 (S.I. 1999 No. 720)
 The Southern Derbyshire Acute Hospitals National Health Service Trust (Transfer of Trust Property) Order 1999 (S.I. 1999 No. 721)
 The National Assembly for Wales (Day of First Ordinary Election) (Postponement of Community Councils Elections etc.) Order 1999 (S.I. 1999 No. 722)
 The Housing Accommodation and Homelessness (Persons subject to Immigration Control) (Amendment) (Scotland) Order 1999 (S.I. 1999 No. 723 (S. 48))
 The National Health Service (Dental Services) (Miscellaneous Amendments) (Scotland) Regulations 1999 (S.I. 1999 No. 724 (S. 49))
 The National Health Service (General Ophthalmic Services) (Scotland) Amendment Regulations 1999 (S.I. 1999 No. 725 (S. 50))
 The Clinical Standards Board for Scotland Order 1999 (S.I. 1999 No. 726 (S. 57))
 The Financial Services Act 1986 (Commencement) (No. 14) Order 1999 (S.I. 1999 No. 727 (C. 23))
 The Prison Rules 1999 (S.I. 1999 No. 728)
 The Police (Conduct) Regulations 1999 (S.I. 1999 No. 730)
 The Police (Conduct) (Senior Officers) Regulations 1999 (S.I. 1999 No. 731)
 The Police (Efficiency) Regulations 1999 (S.I. 1999 No. 732)
 The Public Offers of Securities (Amendment) Regulations 1999 (S.I. 1999 No. 734)
 The Overseas Service (Pensions Supplement) (Amendment) Regulations 1999 (S.I. 1999 No. 735)
 THE FRIENDLY SOCIETIES (GENERAL CHARGE AND FEES) REGULATIONS 1999 (S.I. 1999 No. 736)
 The Scottish Parliament (Letters Patent and Proclamations) Order 1999 (S.I. 1999 No. 737)
 The Building Societies (General Charge and Fees ) Regulations 1999 (S.I. 1999 No. 738)
 The Industrial and Provident Societies (Credit Unions) (Fees) Regulations 1999 (S.I. 1999 No. 739)
 The Industrial and Provident Societies (Fees) Regulations 1999 (S.I. 1999 No. 740)
 The Misuse of Drugs (Licence Fees) (Amendment) Regulations 1999 (S.I. 1999 No. 741)
 The Deregulation (Pipe-lines) Order 1999 (S.I. 1999 No. 742)
 The Control of Major Accident Hazards Regulations 1999 (S.I. 1999 No. 743)
 The Food Labelling (Amendment) Regulations 1999 (S.I. 1999 No. 747)
 The National Health Service (Optical Charges and Payments) (Scotland) Amendment Regulations 1999 (S.I. 1999 No. 748 (S. 52))
 The National Health Service (General Medical Services) (Scotland) Amendment Regulations 1999 (S.I. 1999 No. 749 (S. 53))
 The Agricultural Wages (Scotland) Act 1949 (Amendment) Regulations 1999 (S.I. 1999 No. 750 (S. 54))
 The Inshore Fishing (Prohibition of Fishing and Fishing Methods) (Scotland) Amendment Order 1999 (S.I. 1999 No. 751 (S. 55))
 The Bankruptcy Fees (Scotland) Amendment Regulations 1999 (S.I. 1999 No. 752 (S. 56))
 The High Court of Justiciary Fees Amendment Order 1999 (S.I. 1999 No. 753 (S. 57))
 The Sheriff Court Fees Amendment Order 1999 (S.I. 1999 No. 754 (S. 58))
 The Court of Session etc. Fees Amendment Order 1999 (S.I. 1999 No. 755 (S. 59))
 The Council Tax (Reductions for Disabilities) (Scotland) Amendment Regulations 1999 (S.I. 1999 No. 756 (S. 60))
 The Council Tax (Exempt Dwellings) (Scotland) Amendment Order 1999 (S.I. 1999 No. 757 (S. 61))
 The Wireless Telegraphy (Television Licence Fees) (Amendment) Regulations 1999 (S.I. 1999 No. 765)
 The National Board for Nursing, Midwifery and Health Visiting for England (Constitution and Administration) Amendment Order 1999 (S.I. 1999 No. 766)
 The National Health Service (Charges for Drugs and Appliances and Travelling Expenses and Remission of Charges) Amendment Regulations 1999 (S.I. 1999 No. 767)
 The Road Traffic (Permitted Parking Area and Special Parking Area) (City of Portsmouth) Order 1999 (S.I. 1999 No. 768)
 The Statutory Sick Pay and Statutory Maternity Pay (Decisions) Regulations 1999 (S.I. 1999 No. 776)
 The Local Government Act 1988 (Defined Activities) (Exemption) (Burnley Borough Council and Epping Forest District Council) Order 1999 (S.I. 1999 No. 777)
 The Motor Vehicles (EC Type Approval) (Amendment) Regulations 1999 (S.I. 1999 No. 778)
 The New Deal (25 plus) (Miscellaneous Provisions) Order 1999 (S.I. 1999 No. 779)
 The Parliamentary Pension Scheme (Additional Voluntary Contributions) (Amendment) Regulations 1999 (S.I. 1999 No. 780)
 The Housing for Wales (Abolition) Order 1999 (S.I. 1999 No. 781)
 The Government of Wales Act 1998 (Commencement No. 4) Order 1999 (S.I. 1999 No. 782 (C. 24))
 The Plant Health (Fees) (Forestry) (Great Britain) (Amendment) Regulations 1999 (S.I. 1999 No. 783)
 The Medicines (Monitoring of Advertising) Amendment Regulations 1999 (S.I. 1999 No. 784)
 The Road Traffic (NHS Charges) Regulations 1999 (S.I. 1999 No. 785)
 The Road Traffic (NHS Charges) (Reviews and Appeals) Regulations 1999 (S.I. 1999 No. 786)
 The Scottish Parliament (Elections etc.) Order 1999 (S.I. 1999 No. 787)
 The Scottish Parliament (First Ordinary General Election and First Meeting) Order 1999 (S.I. 1999 No. 788)
 The A423 Banbury to South of Coventry Trunk Road (Marton River Bridge Improvement) Order 1999 (S.I. 1999 No. 789)
 The Mulberry National Health Service Trust (Dissolution) Order 1999 (S.I. 1999 No. 790)
 The Derbyshire Ambulance Service, the Leicestershire Ambulance and Paramedic Service and the Nottinghamshire Ambulance Service National Health Service Trusts (Dissolution) Order 1999 (S.I. 1999 No. 791)
 The South Lincolnshire Community and Mental Health Services National Health Service Trust (Establishment) Amendment Order 1999 (S.I. 1999 No. 792)
 The Merton and Sutton Community, the Richmond, Twickenham and Roehampton Healthcare and the Wandsworth Community Health National Health Service Trusts (Dissolution) Order 1999 (S.I. 1999 No. 793)
 The South West London Community National Health Service Trust (Establishment) Order 1999 (S.I. 1999 No. 794)
 The Teddington Memorial Hospital National Health Service Trust (Establishment) Amendment Order 1999 (S.I. 1999 No. 795)
 The Northumbria Ambulance Service and the Durham County Ambulance Service National Health Service Trusts (Dissolution) Order 1999 (S.I. 1999 No. 796)
 The North East Ambulance Service National Health Service Trust (Establishment) Order 1999 (S.I. 1999 No. 797)
 The Tees, East and North Yorkshire Ambulance Service National Health Service Trust (Establishment) Order 1999 (S.I. 1999 No. 798)
 The Cleveland Ambulance, the Humberside Ambulance Service and the North Yorkshire Ambulance Service National Health Service Trusts (Dissolution) Order 1999 (S.I. 1999 No. 799)
 The Hartlepool and East Durham, the North Tees Health and the South Tees Community and Mental Health National Health Service Trusts (Dissolution) Order 1999 (S.I. 1999 No. 800)

801-900

 The North Tees and Hartlepool National Health Service Trust (Establishment) Order 1999 (S.I. 1999 No. 801)
 The Nursery Education (England) (Amendment) Regulations 1999 (S.I. 1999 No. 802)
 The Environment Act 1995 (Commencement No. 14) Order 1999 (S.I. 1999 No. 803 (C. 25))
 The Welsh Health Common Services Authority (Abolition) Order 1999 (S.I. 1999 No. 804)
 The Health Promotion Authority for Wales (Revocation) Regulations 1999 (S.I. 1999 No. 805)
 The Welsh Health Common Services Authority (Revocation) Regulations 1999 (S.I. 1999 No. 806)
 The Health Promotion Authority for Wales (Abolition) Order 1999 (S.I. 1999 No. 807)
 The Velindre National Health Service Trust (Transfer of Trust Property) Order 1999 (S.I. 1999 No. 808)
 The National Health Service Trusts (Originating Capital Debt) Order 1999 (S.I. 1999 No. 809)
 The Civil Legal Aid (Assessment of Resources) (Amendment) Regulations 1999 (S.I. 1999 No. 813)
 The Legal Advice and Assistance (Amendment) Regulations 1999 (S.I. 1999 No. 814)
 The Legal Aid in Criminal and Care Proceedings (General) (Amendment) (No. 2) Regulations 1999 (S.I. 1999 No. 815)
 The Legal Aid (Mediation in Family Matters) (Amendment) Regulations 1999 (S.I. 1999 No. 816)
 The Defamation Act 1996 (Commencement No. 1) Order 1999 (S.I. 1999 No. 817 (C. 26))
 The Police Appeals Tribunals Rules 1999 (S.I. 1999 No. 818)
 The Venture Capital Trust (Amendment) Regulations 1999 (S.I. 1999 No. 819)
 The Social Security (Overlapping Benefits) Amendment Regulations 1999 (S.I. 1999 No. 820)
 The National Crime Squad (Secretary of State's Objectives) Order 1999 (S.I. 1999 No. 821)
 The NCIS (Secretary of State's Objectives) Order 1999 (S.I. 1999 No. 822)
 The Income Tax (Paying and Collecting Agents) (Amendment) Regulations 1999 (S.I. 1999 No. 823)
 The Income Tax (Employments) (Amendment No. 2) Regulations 1999 (S.I. 1999 No. 824)
 The Income Tax (Sub-contractors in the Construction Industry) (Amendment) Regulations 1999 (S.I. 1999 No. 825)
 The Velindre National Health Service Trust (Establishment) Amendment Order 1999 (S.I. 1999 No. 826)
 The Social Security (Contributions) Amendment (No. 2) Regulations 1999 (S.I. 1999 No. 827)
 The Housing Support Grant (Scotland) Order 1999 (S.I. 1999 No. 828 (S. 62))
 The Scottish Parliament (Regional Returning Officers) (Scotland) (No.2) Order 1999 (S.I. 1999 No. 829)
 The Education (Recognised Bodies) Order 1999 (S.I. 1999 No. 833)
 The Education (Listed Bodies) Order 1999 (S.I. 1999 No. 834)
 The Sea Fish Industry Authority (Levy) (Amendment) Regulations 1998 Confirmatory Order 1999 (S.I. 1999 No. 837)
 The Tees and North East Yorkshire National Health Service Trust (Establishment) Order 1999 (S.I. 1999 No. 847)
 The Epsom and St. Helier National Health Service Trust (Establishment) Order 1999 (S.I. 1999 No. 848)
 The Epsom Health Care and the St. Helier National Health Service Trusts (Dissolution) Order 1999 (S.I. 1999 No. 849)
 The Allington, the East Suffolk Local Health Services and the Mid Anglia Community Health National Health Service Trusts (Dissolution) Order 1999 (S.I. 1999 No. 850)
 The Local Health Partnerships National Health Service Trust (Establishment) Order 1999 (S.I. 1999 No. 851)
 The Medicines (Products Other Than Veterinary Drugs) (General Sale List) Amendment Order 1999 (S.I. 1999 No. 852)
 The Railways (Rateable Values) (Scotland) Order 1999 (S.I. 1999 No. 853 (S. 63))
 The Functions of Traffic Wardens (Scotland) Order 1999 (S.I. 1999 No. 854 (S. 64))
 The Public Trustee (Fees) Order 1999 (S.I. 1999 No. 855)
 The Protection of Wrecks (M/S Estonia) Order 1999 (S.I. 1999 No. 856)
 The Injuries in War (Shore Employments) Compensation (Amendment) Scheme 1999 (S.I. 1999 No. 857)
 The Social Security Benefits Up-rating Regulations 1999 (S.I. 1999 No. 858)
 The North/South Co-operation (Implementation Bodies) (Northern Ireland) Order 1999 (S.I. 1999 No. 859)
 The Police (Health and Safety) Regulations 1999 (S.I. 1999 No. 860)
 The Measuring Instruments (EEC Requirements) (Fees) (Amendment) Regulations 1999 (S.I. 1999 No. 861)
 The Social Security Benefits Up-rating and Miscellaneous Increases Regulations 1999 (S.I. 1999 No. 862)
 The National Health Service (Liabilities to Third Parties Scheme) Regulations 1999 (S.I. 1999 No. 873)
 The National Health Service (Property Expenses Scheme) Regulations 1999 (S.I. 1999 No. 874)
 The Overseas Insurers (Tax Representatives) Regulations 1999 (S.I. 1999 No. 881)
 The Bovine Spongiform Encephalopathy (Feeding Stuffs and Surveillance) Regulations 1999 (S.I. 1999 No. 882)
 The Southampton University Hospitals National Health Service Trust (Establishment) Amendment Order 1999 (S.I. 1999 No. 884)
 The Cornwall Healthcare National Health Service Trust (Establishment) Amendment (No. 2) Order 1999 (S.I. 1999 No. 885)
 The Weston Park Hospital National Health Service Trust (Dissolution) Order 1999 (S.I. 1999 No. 886)
 The Central Sheffield University Hospitals National Health Service Trust (Establishment) Amendment Order 1999 (S.I. 1999 No. 887)
 The Sefton and Lancashire Community National Health Service Trust (Establishment) Order 1999 (S.I. 1999 No. 888)
 The Southport and Formby, the Southport and Formby Community Health Services and the West Lancashire National Health Service Trusts (Dissolution) Order 1999 (S.I. 1999 No. 889)
 The Southport & Ormskirk Hospital National Health Service Trust (Establishment) Order 1999 (S.I. 1999 No. 890)
 The Bath Mental Health Care National Health Service Trust (Establishment) Amendment Order 1999 (S.I. 1999 No. 891)
 The Barnet and Chase Farm Hospitals National Health Service Trust (Establishment) Order 1999 (S.I. 1999 No. 892)
 The Chase Farm Hospitals and the Wellhouse National Health Service Trusts (Dissolution) Order 1999 (S.I. 1999 No. 893)
 The Bedford and Shires Health and Care and the South Bedfordshire Community Health Care National Health Service Trusts (Dissolution) Order 1999 (S.I. 1999 No. 894)
 The Bedfordshire and Luton Community National Health Service Trust (Establishment) Order 1999 (S.I. 1999 No. 895)
 The East Kent Hospitals National Health Service Trust (Establishment) Order 1999 (S.I. 1999 No. 896)
 The Kent and Canterbury Hospitals, the South Kent Hospitals and the Thanet Health Care National Health Service Trusts (Dissolution) Order 1999 (S.I. 1999 No. 897)
 The Community Health South London National Health Service Trust (Establishment) Order 1999 (S.I. 1999 No. 898)
 The South London and Maudsley National Health Service Trust (Establishment) Order 1999 (S.I. 1999 No. 899)
 The Bethlem and Maudsley, the Lambeth Healthcare, the Lewisham and Guy's Mental Health and the Optimum Health Services National Health Service Trusts (Dissolution) Order 1999 (S.I. 1999 No. 900)

901-1000

 The Education (Individual Pupil Information) (Prescribed Persons) Regulations 1999 (S.I. 1999 No. 903)
 The Prosecution of Offences Act 1985 (Specified Proceedings) Order 1999 (S.I. 1999 No. 904)
 The Public Lending Right (Increase of Limit) Order 1999 (S.I. 1999 No. 905)
 The Prevention of Terrorism (Temporary Provisions) Act 1989 (Continuance) Order 1999 (S.I. 1999 No. 906)
 The Income Support (General) (Standard InterestRate Amendment) (No. 3) Regulations 1999 (S.I. 1999 No. 907)
 The Parkside National Health Service Trust (Establishment) Amendment Order 1999 (S.I. 1999 No. 908)
 The Royal London Homoeopathic National Health Service Trust (Dissolution) Order 1999 (S.I. 1999 No. 909)
 The East Midlands Ambulance Service National Health Service Trust (Establishment) Order 1999 (S.I. 1999 No. 910)
 The North West London Hospitals National Health Service Trust (Establishment) Order 1999 (S.I. 1999 No. 913)
 The Central Middlesex Hospital and the Northwick Park and St. Mark's National Health Service Trusts (Dissolution) Order 1999 (S.I. 1999 No. 914)
 The Water Protection Zone (River Dee Catchment) Designation Order 1999 (S.I. 1999 No. 915)
 The Water Protection Zone (River Dee Catchment) (Procedural and Other Provisions) Regulations 1999 (S.I. 1999 No. 916)
 The Education (School Teachers' Pay and Conditions) Order 1999 (S.I. 1999 No. 917)
 The Diseases of Animals (Approved Disinfectants) (Amendment) Order 1999 (S.I. 1999 No. 919)
 The Housing Benefit and Council Tax Benefit(General) Amendment Regulations 1999 (S.I. 1999 No. 920)
 The Bovine Spongiform Encephalopathy (No. 2) (Amendment) Order 1999 (S.I. 1999 No. 921)
 Act of Sederunt (Summary Applications, Statutory Applications and Appeals etc. Rules) 1999 (S.I. 1999 No. 929 (S. 65))
 The Wireless Telegraphy (Exemption) Regulations 1999 (S.I. 1999 No. 930)
 The United Kingdom Ecolabelling Board (Abolition) Regulations 1999 (S.I. 1999 No. 931)
 The National Assembly for Wales (Returning Officers' Charges) Order 1999 (S.I. 1999 No. 942)
 The National Assembly for Wales (Combination of Polls) (Apportionment of Cost) Order 1999 (S.I. 1999 No. 943)
 The National Assembly for Wales (First Meeting) Order 1999 (S.I. 1999 No. 944)
 The National Health Service Trusts (Membership and Procedure) Amendment Regulations 1999 (S.I. 1999 No. 945)
 The Health Authorities (Membership and Procedure) Amendment Regulations 1999 (S.I. 1999 No. 946)
 The European Parliamentary Elections (Returning Officers) Order 1999 (S.I. 1999 No. 948)
 The European Parliamentary Elections (Day of Poll) Order 1999 (S.I. 1999 No. 949)
 The Returning Officers (Parliamentary Constituencies) (England) (Amendment) Order 1999 (S.I. 1999 No. 950)
 The Housing (Right to Buy) (Priority of Charges) Order 1999 (S.I. 1999 No. 952)
 The Education (Secondary Education in Further Education Institutions) Regulations 1999 (S.I. 1999 No. 954)
 The Young Offender Institution (Amendment) (No. 2) Rules 1999 (S.I. 1999 No. 962)
 The Education (Inspection of Vocational Training) (Prescribed Persons and Bodies Awarding or Authenticating Vocational Qualifications) Regulations 1999 (S.I. 1999 No. 963)
 The Ordnance Survey Trading Fund Order 1999 (S.I. 1999 No. 965)
 The New Opportunities Fund (Specification of Initiatives) Order 1999 (S.I. 1999 No. 966)
 The Social Security (Contributions) Amendment (No. 3) Regulations 1999 (S.I. 1999 No. 975)
 The Social Security (New Deal Pilot) Amendment Regulations 1999 (S.I. 1999 No. 976)
 The Child Support (Miscellaneous Amendments) Regulations 1999 (S.I. 1999 No. 977)
 The Social Security Contributions, etc. (Decisions and Appeals—Transitional Modifications) Regulations 1999 (S.I. 1999 No. 978)
 The Social Security Contributions (Transfer of Functions, etc.) (Specification of Contracts) Order 1999 (S.I. 1999 No. 979)
 Distraint by Authorised Officers (Fees, Costs and Charges) Regulations 1999 (S.I. 1999 No. 980)
 The Planning (Control of Major-Accident Hazards) Regulations 1999 (S.I. 1999 No. 981)
 The Sweeteners in Food (Amendment) Regulations 1999 (S.I. 1999 No. 982)
 The Register of Patent Agents and the Register of Trade Mark Agents (Amendment) Rules 1999 (S.I. 1999 No. 983)
 The Dual-Use and Related Goods (Export Control) (Amendment) Regulations 1999 (S.I. 1999 No. 984)
 The Social Landlords (Additional Purposes or Objects) Order 1999 (S.I. 1999 No. 985)
 The Right to Time Off for Study or Training Regulations 1999 (S.I. 1999 No. 986)
 The Teaching and Higher Education Act 1998 (Commencement No. 5) Order 1999 (S.I. 1999 No. 987 (C. 27))
 The Epsom College (Modification) Order 1999 (S.I. 1999 No. 988)
 The Education (Information About Individual Pupils) (England) Regulations 1999 (S.I. 1999 No. 989)
 The Social Security and Child Support (Decisions and Appeals) Regulations 1999 (S.I. 1999 No. 991)
 The Merchant Shipping (Fire Protection) (Amendment) Regulations 1999 (S.I. 1999 No. 992)
 The Combined Probation Areas (Oxfordshire and Buckinghamshire) Order 1999 (S.I. 1999 No. 993)
 The Combined Probation Areas (Berkshire) Order 1999 (S.I. 1999 No. 994)
 The Limit in Relation to Licences to Provide Radio Multiplex Services Order 1999 (S.I. 1999 No. 995)
 The A205 Trunk Road (Greenwich) Red Route Traffic Order 1998 Variation Order 1999 (S.I. 1999 No. 996)
 The A1 Trunk Road (Barnet) Red Route (Clearway) Traffic Order 1996 Experimental Variation Order 1999 (S.I. 1999 No. 997)
 The London Borough of Barnet (Trunk Roads) Red Route (Priority Traffic Lanes) Experimental Traffic Order 1999 (S.I. 1999 No. 998)
 The Road Humps and Traffic Calming (Scotland) Amendment Regulations 1999 (S.I. 1999 No. 1000 (S. 70))

1001-1100

 The Education (Student Loans) (Scotland) Regulations 1999 (S.I. 1999 No. 1001 (S. 71))
 The Wildlife and Countryside Act 1981 (Variation of Schedule 9) Order 1999 (S.I. 1999 No. 1002)
 The Railways (Rateable Values) (Amendment) Order 1999 (S.I. 1999 No. 1003)
 The Council Tax (Reductions for Disabilities) (Amendment) Regulations 1999 (S.I. 1999 No. 1004)
 The Food Protection (Emergency Prohibitions) (Amnesic Shellfish Poisoning) Order 1999 (S.I. 1999 No. 1005)
 The Anti-Pollution Works Regulations 1999 (S.I. 1999 No. 1006)
 The Highway Litter Clearance and Cleaning (Transfer Of Responsibility) (North West Leicestershire and South Derbyshire) Order 1999 (S.I. 1999 No. 1007)
 The Civil Procedure (Amendment) Rules 1999 (S.I. 1999 No. 1008 (L. 8))
 The Civil Procedure Act 1997 (Commencement No.2) Order 1999 (S.I. 1999 No. 1009 (C. 28))
 The High Court and County Courts (Allocation of Arbitration Proceedings) (Amendment) Order 1999 (S.I. 1999 No. 1010)
 The Civil Courts (Amendment) (No. 2) Order 1999 (S.I. 1999 No. 1011)
 The Family Proceedings (Miscellaneous Amendments) Rules 1999 (S.I. 1999 No. 1012 (L. 9))
 The Contracting Out of Functions (Court Staff) Order 1999 (S.I. 1999 No. 1013)
 The High Court and County Courts Jurisdiction (Amendment) Order 1999 (S.I. 1999 No. 1014)
 The Non-Contentious Probate (Amendment) Rules 1999 (S.I. 1999 No. 1015 (L. 10))
 The School Standards and Framework Act 1998 (Commencement No. 6 and Saving and Transitional Provisions) Order 1999 (S.I. 1999 No. 1016 (C.29))
 The Scotland Act 1998 (Transitory and Transitional Provisions) (Removal of Judges) Order 1999 (S.I. 1999 No. 1017)
 The Home Energy Efficiency Scheme (Amendment) (Scotland) Regulations 1999 (S.I. 1999 No. 1018 (S. 72))
 The Civil Legal Aid (Financial Conditions) (Scotland) Regulations 1999 (S.I. 1999 No. 1019 (S. 73))
 The Advice and Assistance (Financial Conditions) (Scotland) Regulations 1999 (S.I. 1999 No. 1020 (S. 74))
 The Court Funds (Amendment) Rules 1999 (S.I. 1999 No. 1021 (L. 11))
 The Insolvency (Amendment) (No. 2) Rules 1999 (S.I. 1999 No. 1022)
 The Insolvent Companies (Disqualification of Unfit Directors) Proceedings (Amendment) Rules 1999 (S.I. 1999 No. 1023)
 The Health Authorities (England) Establishment Order 1996 Amendment and the Cambridgeshire and Norfolk Health Authorities (Establishment etc.) (Amendment) Order 1999 (S.I. 1999 No. 1024)
 The Highways (Road Humps) Regulations 1999 (S.I. 1999 No. 1025)
 The Highways (Traffic Calming) Regulations 1999 (S.I. 1999 No. 1026)
 The Social Security Contributions (Decisions and Appeals) Regulations 1999 (S.I. 1999 No. 1027)
 The Professions Supplementary to Medicine (Registration Rules) (Amendment) Order of Council 1999 (S.I. 1999 No. 1028)
 The Personal Portfolio Bonds (Tax) Regulations 1999 (S.I. 1999 No. 1029)
 The Scotland Act 1998 (Consequential Modifications) (No.1) Order 1999 (S.I. 1999 No. 1042)
 The North Western and North Wales Sea Fisheries District Order 1999 (S.I. 1999 No. 1043)
 The Prescription Only Medicines (Human Use) Amendment Order 1999 (S.I. 1999 No. 1044)
 The Social Security Administration (Fraud) Act 1997 (Commencement No. 7) Order 1999 (S.I. 1999 No. 1046 (C. 29))
 The Child Support (Miscellaneous Amendments) (No. 2) Regulations 1999 (S.I. 1999 No. 1047)
 The Street Works Register (Registration Fees) Regulations 1999 (S.I. 1999 No. 1048)
 The Street Works (Registers, Notices, Directions and Designations) (Amendment) Regulations 1999 (S.I. 1999 No. 1049)
 The South Downs Health National Health Service Trust (Establishment) Amendment Order 1999 (S.I. 1999 No. 1052)
 The Non-Road Mobile Machinery (Emission of Gaseous and Particulate Pollutants) Regulations 1999 (S.I. 1999 No. 1053)
 The Non-Road Mobile Machinery (Type Approval) (Fees) Regulations 1999 (S.I. 1999 No. 1054)
 The Social Security Act 1998 (Commencement No. 6) Order 1999 (S.I. 1999 No. 1055 (C. 30))
 The National Savings Bank (Investment Deposits) (Limits) (Amendment) Order 1999 (S.I. 1999 No. 1056)
 The National Health Service (General Medical Services) (Scotland) Amendment (No.2) Regulations 1999 (S.I. 1999 No. 1057 (S. 75))
 The Right to Time Off for Study or Training (Scotland) Regulations 1999 (S.I. 1999 No. 1058 (S. 76))
 The Education (Assisted Places) (Scotland) Amendment Regulations 1999 (S.I. 1999 No. 1059 (S. 77))
 The St Mary's Music School (Aided Places) Amendment Regulations 1999 (S.I. 1999 No. 1060 (S. 78))
 The A720 (Edinburgh City Bypass) Special Road (Prohibition of Traffic On Hard Shoulders) Regulations 1999 (S.I. 1999 No. 1061 (S. 79))
 The Merchant Shipping (Fees) (Amendment) Regulations 1999 (S.I. 1999 No. 1063)
 The School Standards and Framework Act 1998 (Admissions and Standard Numbers) (Modification) Regulations 1999 (S.I. 1999 No. 1064)
 The Education (Induction Arrangements for School Teachers) (England) Regulations 1999 (S.I. 1999 No. 1065)
 The Education (Information as to Provision of Education) (England) Regulations 1999 (S.I. 1999 No. 1066)
 The Food Protection (Emergency Prohibitions) (Paralytic Shellfish Poisoning) (No.2) Order 1998 Partial Revocation (No.2) Order 1999 (S.I. 1999 No. 1067)
 The Highland Primary Care National Health Service Trust (Establishment) Amendment Order 1999 (S.I. 1999 No. 1069 (S. 80))
 The National Health Service Trusts (Dissolution) (Scotland) Order 1999 (S.I. 1999 No. 1070 (S. 81))
 The Lothian University Hospitals National Health Service Trust (Establishment) Amendment Order 1999 (S.I. 1999 No. 1071 (S. 82))
 The Police (Conduct) (Scotland) Amendment Regulations 1999 (S.I. 1999 No. 1072 (S. 83))
 The Registered Housing Associations (Accounting Requirements) (Scotland) Order 1999 (S.I. 1999 No. 1073 (S. 84))
 The Police (Conduct) (Senior Officers) (Scotland) Regulations 1999 (S.I. 1999 No. 1074 (S. 85))
 The Road Traffic (NHS Charges) Act 1999(Commencement No. 1) Order 1999 (S.I. 1999 No. 1075 (C. 31))
 The Motorways Traffic (M621 Motorway) Regulations 1999 (S.I. 1999 No. 1077)
 The Education (Lower Primary Class Sizes) (Scotland) Regulations 1999 (S.I. 1999 No. 1080 (S. 86))
 The Scotland Act 1998 (Transitory and Transitional Provisions) (Grants to Members and Officeholders) Order 1999 (S.I. 1999 No. 1081)
 The Scotland Act 1998 (Transitory and Transitional Provisions) (Scottish Parliamentary Pension Scheme) Order 1999 (S.I. 1999 No. 1082)
 The National Assembly for Wales (Assembly Members) (Salaries) (Limitation) Order 1999 (S.I. 1999 No. 1083)
 The Local Authorities (Direct Labour Organisations) (Competition) (Wales) (Amendment) Regulations 1999 (S.I. 1999 No. 1084)
 The Fees in the Registers of Scotland Amendment Order 1999 (S.I. 1999 No. 1085 (S. 87))
 The Local Authorities (Members' Allowances) (Amendment) Regulations 1999 (S.I. 1999 No. 1086)
 The Local Authorities (Members' Allowances) (Amendment) (No. 2) Regulations 1999 (S.I. 1999 No. 1087)
 The Social Security (Incapacity, Earnings and Work Trials) Pilot Schemes Regulations 1999 (S.I. 1999 No. 1088)
 The Plant Breeders' Rights (Fees) (Amendment) Regulations 1999 (S.I. 1999 No. 1089)
 The Seeds (National Lists of Varieties) (Fees) (Amendment) Regulations 1999 (S.I. 1999 No. 1090)
 The A13 Trunk Road (Tower Hamlets) Red Route Experimental Traffic Order 1998 Experimental Variation Order 1999 (S.I. 1999 No. 1091)
 The Patents (Amendment) Rules 1999 (S.I. 1999 No. 1092)
 The Patents (Fees) (Amendment) Rules 1999 (S.I. 1999 No. 1093)
 The Scottish Parliamentary Elections (Returning Officers' Charges) Order 1999 (S.I. 1999 No. 1094)
 The Scotland Act 1998 (Transitory and Transitional Provisions)(Standing Orders and Parliamentary Publications) Order 1999 (S.I. 1999 No. 1095)
 The Scotland Act 1998 (Transitory and Transitional Provisions) (Statutory Instruments) Order 1999 (S.I. 1999 No. 1096)
 The Scotland Act 1998 (Transitory and Transitional Provisions)(Salaries and Allowances) Order 1999 (S.I. 1999 No. 1097)
 The Scotland Act 1998 (Transitory and Transitional Provisions) (Administration of the Parliament) Order 1999 (S.I. 1999 No. 1098)
 The Education (Nursery Education and Early Years Development) (Wales) Regulations 1999 (S.I. 1999 No. 1099)
 The Welsh Language Schemes (Public Bodies) Order 1999 (S.I. 1999 No. 1100)

1101-1200

 The National Assembly for Wales (Oath of Allegiance in Welsh) Order 1999 (S.I. 1999 No.1101)
 The Sex Discrimination (Gender Reassignment) Regulations 1999 (S.I. 1999 No. 1102)
 The Bovines and Bovine Products (Trade) Regulations 1999 (S.I. 1999 No. 1103)
 The Transfer of Property etc. (Scottish Ministers) Order 1999 (S.I. 1999 No. 1104)
 The Transfer of Property etc. (Lord Advocate) Order 1999 (S.I. 1999 No. 1105)
 The Transfer of Property etc. (Scottish Parliamentary Corporate Body) Order 1999 (S.I. 1999 No. 1106)
 The Environment Act 1995 (Consequential Amendment) Regulations 1999 (S.I. 1999 No. 1108)
 The Pesticides (Maximum Residue Levels in Crops, Food and Feeding Stuffs) (Amendment) Regulations 1999 (S.I. 1999 No. 1109)
 The Fish Producers' Organisations (Formation Grants) Regulations 1999 (S.I. 1999 No. 1110)
 The District Salmon Fishery Boards Order 1999 (S.I. 1999 No. 1111 (S. 90))
 The Road Traffic (Permitted Parking Area and Special Parking Area) (County of East Sussex) (Borough of Hastings) Order 1999 (S.I. 1999 No. 1112)
 The Civil Legal Aid (General) (Amendment) Regulations 1999 (S.I. 1999 No. 1113)
 The Argyll and Clyde Acute Hospitals National Health Service Trust (Establishment) Amendment Order 1999 (S.I. 1999 No. 1115 (S. 88))
 The Parole Board (Scotland) Amendment Rules 1999 (S.I. 1999 No. 1116 (S. 89))
 The London Cab Order 1999 (S.I. 1999 No. 1117)
 The Cardiff and District Community National Health Service Trust (Establishment) Order 1999 (S.I. 1999 No. 1118)
 The University Hospital of Wales and Llandough Hospital National Health Service Trust (Establishment) Order 1999 (S.I. 1999 No. 1119)* The National Health Service Trusts (Wales) (Dissolution) Order 1999 ([http://www.legislation.gov.uk/uksi/1999/1120/contents/made S.I. 1999 No. 1120)
 The Education (Chief Inspector of Schools in England) Order 1999 (S.I. 1999 No. 1121)
 The Education (Inspectors of Schools in England) Order 1999 (S.I. 1999 No. 1122)
 The Air Navigation (Fourth Amendment) Order 1999 (S.I. 1999 No. 1123)
 The Consular Relations (Merchant Shipping) (Union of Soviet Socialist Republics) (Revocation) Order 1999 (S.I. 1999 No. 1124)
 The International Mobile Satellite Organisation (Immunities and Privileges) Order 1999 (S.I. 1999 No. 1125)
 The Scottish Adjacent Waters Boundaries Order 1999 (S.I. 1999 No. 1126)
 The Scottish Administration (Offices) Order 1999 (S.I. 1999 No. 1127)
 The National Minimum Wage (Offshore Employment) Order 1999 (S.I. 1999 No. 1128)
 The Education (Inspectors of Schools in Wales (No. 2) Order 1999 (S.I. 1999 No. 1129)
 The Students' Allowances (Scotland) Regulations 1999 (S.I. 1999 No. 1131 (S. 91))
 The Health Boards (Membership and Procedure) (No.2) Amendment Regulations 1999 (S.I. 1999 No. 1132 (S.92))
 The National Health Service Trusts (Membership and Procedure) (Scotland) Amendment Regulations 1999 (S.I. 1999 No. 1133 (S.93))
 The National Health Service Trusts (Appointment of Trustees) (Scotland) Order 1999 (S.I. 1999 No. 1134 (S. 94))
 The Housing (Right to Acquire) (Discount) Order 1999 (S.I. 1999 No. 1135)
 The Miscellaneous Food Additives (Amendment) Regulations 1999 (S.I. 1999 No. 1136)
 The Public Offers of Securities (Amendment) (No. 2) Regulations 1999 (S.I. 1999 No. 1146)
 A4 Trunk Road (Hammersmith & Fulham and Kensington & Chelsea) Red Route Traffic Order 1999 (S.I. 1999 No. 1147)
 The Water Supply (Water Fittings) Regulations 1999 (S.I. 1999 No. 1148)
 The Magistrates' Courts (Forms) (Amendment) Rules 1999 (S.I. 1999 No. 1149 (L. 12))
 The Offshore Installations (Safety Zones) (No. 2) Order 1999 (S.I. 1999 No. 1150)
 The Northern Ireland (Emergency Provisions) Act 1996 (Code of Practice) Order 1999 (S.I. 1999 No. 1151)
 The Northern Ireland (Sentences) Act 1998 (Specified Organisations) Order 1999 (S.I. 1999 No. 1152)
 The Income Support (General) (Standard Interest Rate Amendment) (No. 4) Regulations 1999 (S.I. 1999 No. 1153)
 The City of Edinburgh (Guided Busways) Order (Section 51) Order 1999 (S.I. 1999 No. 1154 (S. 95))
 The Southend Community Care Services National Health Service Trust (Establishment) Amendment Order 1999 (S.I. 1999 No. 1167)
 The St George's Healthcare National Health Service Trust (Establishment) Amendment Order 1999 (S.I. 1999 No. 1168)
 The South Birmingham Mental Health National Health Service Trust (Establishment) Amendment Order 1999 (S.I. 1999 No. 1169)
 The Lerwick Harbour Revision Order 1999 (S.I. 1999 No. 1170)
 The Northern Ireland (Emergency Provisions) Act 1996 (Audio Recording of Interviews) Order 1999 (S.I. 1999 No. 1172)
 The Countryside Access (Amendment) Regulations 1999 (S.I. 1999 No. 1174)
 The Environmentally Sensitive Areas (Wales) Designation Orders (Amendment) Order 1999 (S.I. 1999 No. 1175)
 The Land in Care Scheme (Tir Gofal) (Wales) Regulations 1999 (S.I. 1999 No. 1176)
 The Countryside Stewardship (Amendment) Regulations 1999 (S.I. 1999 No. 1177)
 The Education (School Performance Information) (England) Regulations 1999 (S.I. 1999 No. 1178)
 The Beef Special Premium (Amendment) Regulations 1999 (S.I. 1999 No. 1179)
 The Scottish Criminal Cases Review Commission (Application to Summary Proceedings) Order 1999 (S.I. 1999 No. 1181 (S. 96)])
 The Local Government Act 1988 (Defined Activities) (Exemptions) (Aylesbury Vale District Council and Thanet District Council) Order 1999 (S.I. 1999 No. 1185)
 The M606/M62 Motorways (Bradford Link) (Speed Limit) Regulations 1999 (S.I. 1999 No. 1187)
 The Education (Baseline Assessment) (Wales) Regulations 1999 (S.I. 1999 No. 1188)
 The Criminal Justice Act 1993 (Commencement No. 10) Order 1999 (S.I. 1999 No. 1189 (C. 32))
 The Disability Discrimination Act 1995 (Commencement Order No. 6) Order 1999 (S.I. 1999 No. 1190 (c. 33))
 The Disability Discrimination (Services and Premises) Regulations 1999 (S.I. 1999 No. 1191)
 The Food Protection (Emergency Prohibitions) (Amnesic Shellfish Poisoning) Order 1999 Revocation Order 1999 (S.I. 1999 No. 1192)
 The Swansea-Manchester Trunk Road (A483) (South of Welshpool Bypass Detrunking) Order 1999 (S.I. 1999 No. 1196)
 The Magistrates' Courts (Procedure) Act 1998 (Commencement No. 2) Order 1999 (S.I. 1999 No. 1197 (C. 34))

1201-1300

 The A1 Trunk Road (Barnet) Red Route (Speed Limit) Experimental Traffic Order 1999 (S.I. 1999 No. 1203)
 The Traffic Areas (Reorganisation) (Wales) Order 1999 (S.I. 1999 No. 1204)
 The Road Traffic (Parking Adjudicators) (London) (Amendment) Regulations 1999 (S.I. 1999 No. 1205)
 The Social Landlords (Additional Purposes or Objects) (No. 2) Order 1999 (S.I. 1999 No. 1206)
 The Exchange of Securities (General) (Amendment) Rules 1999 (S.I. 1999 No. 1207)
 The Stock Transfer (Gilt-edged Securities) (CGO Service) (Amendment) Regulations 1999 (S.I. 1999 No. 1208)
 The Financial Markets and Insolvency (CGO Service) Regulations 1999 (S.I. 1999 No. 1209)
 The Stock Transfer (Gilt-edged Securities) (Exempt Transfer) (Amendment) Regulations 1999 (S.I. 1999 No. 1210)
 The General Optical Council (Education Committee Rules) Order of Council 1999 (S.I. 1999 No. 1211)
 The Local Government Pension Scheme (Miscellaneous Provisions) Regulations 1999 (S.I. 1999 No. 1212)
 The Housing (Preservation of Right to Buy) (Amendment) Regulations 1999 (S.I. 1999 No. 1213)
 The European Parliamentary Elections Regulations 1999 (S.I. 1999 No. 1214)
 The Building Societies (Merger Notification Statement) Regulations 1999 (S.I. 1999 No. 1215)
 The Civil Procedure (Modification of Enactments) Order 1999 (S.I. 1999 No. 1217)
 The Luton and Dunstable Hospital National Health Service Trust (Establishment) Amendment Order 1999 (S.I. 1999 No. 1218)
 Act of Sederunt (Rules of the Court of Session Amendment No. 3) (External Orders Affecting Proceeds of Crime) 1999 (S.I. 1999 No. 1220 (S.97))
 The Lay Representatives (Rights of Audience) Order 1999 (S.I. 1999 No. 1225)
 The Recreation Grounds (Revocation of Parish Council Byelaws) Order 1999 (S.I. 1999 No. 1227)
 The Plant Protection Products (Amendment) Regulations 1999 (S.I. 1999 No. 1228)
 The Social Security Revaluation of Earnings Factors Order 1999 (S.I. 1999 No. 1235)
 The Education (National Curriculum) (Key Stage 1 Assessment Arrangements) (England) Order 1999 (S.I. 1999 No. 1236)
 The Rail Vehicle Accessibility (Midland Metro T69 Vehicles) (Exemption No. 2) Order 1999 (S.I. 1999 No. 1256)
 The Gaming Clubs (Hours and Charges) (Amendment) Regulations 1999 (S.I. 1999 No. 1258)
 The Amusements with Prizes (Variation of Monetary Limits) Order 1999 (S.I. 1999 No. 1259)
 The Gaming Act (Variation of Monetary Limits) Order 1999 (S.I. 1999 No. 1260)
 The Federal Republic of Yugoslavia (Supply, Sale and Export of Petroleum and Petroleum Products) (Penalties and Licences) Regulations 1999 (S.I. 1999 No. 1261)
 The A3220 Trunk Road (Kensington & Chelsea and Hammersmith & Fulham) Red Route Traffic Order 1999 (S.I. 1999 No. 1264)
 The Secure Remands and Committals (Prescribed Description of Children and Young Persons) Order 1999 (S.I. 1999 No. 1265)
 The National Crime Squad (Complaints) (Amendment) Regulations 1999 (S.I. 1999 No. 1266)
 The Local Government (Publication of Staffing Information) (England) (Revocation) Regulations 1999 (S.I. 1999 No. 1267)
 The European Parliamentary Elections (Northern Ireland) (Amendment) Regulations 1999 (S.I. 1999 No. 1268)
 The NCIS (Complaints) (Amendment) Regulations 1999 (S.I. 1999 No. 1273)
 The National Health Service (Clinical Negligence Scheme) (Amendment) Regulations 1999 (S.I. 1999 No. 1274)
 The National Health Service (Existing Liabilities Scheme) (Amendment) Regulations 1999 (S.I. 1999 No. 1275)
 The Warehousekeepers and Owners of Warehoused Goods Regulations 1999 (S.I. 1999 No.1278)
 The Crime and Disorder Act 1998 (Commencement No. 4) Order 1999 (S.I. 1999 No. 1279 (C. 36))
 The Criminal Justice Act 1991 (Commencement No. 3) (Amendment) Order 1999 (S.I. 1999 No. 1280 (C. 37))
 Act of Sederunt (Rules of the Court of Session Amendment No. 4) (References to the Court of Justice of the European Communities) 1999 (S.I. 1999 No. 1281 (S.98))
 Act of Adjournal (Criminal Procedure Rules Amendment No. 2) 1999 (S.I. 1999 No. 1282 (S.99))
 The Education (Funding for Teacher Training) Designation Order 1999 (S.I. 1999 No. 1283)
 The Durham College of Agriculture and Horticulture (Dissolution) Order 1999 (S.I. 1999 No. 1284)
 The East Durham Community College (Dissolution) Order 1999 (S.I. 1999 No. 1285)
 The Education (Adjudicators Inquiry Procedure etc.) Regulations 1999 (S.I. 1999 No. 1286)
 The Education (Head Teachers) Regulations 1999 (S.I. 1999 No. 1287)
 The Road Traffic (Permitted Parking Area and Special Parking Area) (County Borough of Neath Port Talbot) Order 1999 (S.I. 1999 No. 1288)
 The Pembrokeshire (Llangwm and Hook Community) Order 1999 (S.I. 1999 No. 1289)
 The Government of Wales Act 1998 (Commencement No. 5) Order 1999 (S.I. 1999 No. 1290 (C. 38))

1301-1400

 The Environment Act 1995 (Commencement No. 15) Order 1999 (S.I. 1999 No. 1301 (C. 39))
 The Social Security (Adjudication) (Amendment) Regulations 1999 (S.I. 1999 No. 1302)
 The Registration of Births, Deaths and Marriages (Fees) (Amendment) Order 1999 (S.I. 1999 No. 1303)
 The Child Support Commissioners (Procedure) Regulations 1999 (S.I. 1999 No. 1305)
 The Wirral Tramway Order 1999 (S.I. 1999 No. 1306)
 The Housing (Right to Acquire or Enfranchise) (Designated Rural Areas) Order 1999 (S.I. 1999 No. 1307)
 The Chiropractors Act 1994 (Commencement No. 2) Order 1999 (S.I. 1999 No. 1309 (C. 40))
 The Carriage by Air Acts (Implementation of Protocol No. 4 of Montreal, 1975) Order 1999 (S.I. 1999 No. 1312)
 The Carriage by Air (Parties to Convention) Order 1999 (S.I. 1999 No. 1313)
 The Broadcasting (Guernsey) Order 1999 (S.I. 1999 No.1314)
 The Broadcasting (Jersey) Order 1999 (S.I. 1999 No. 1315)
 The Geneva Conventions Act (Guernsey) Order 1999 (S.I. 1999 No. 1316)
 The Women Priests (Channel Islands) Order 1999 (S.I. 1999 No. 1317)
 The Reciprocal Enforcement of Maintenance Orders (Hague Convention Countries) (Variation) Order 1999 (S.I. 1999 No. 1318)
 The Scotland Act 1998 (Cross-Border Public Authorities)(Specification) Order 1999 (S.I. 1999 No. 1319)
 The Judicial Committee (Powers in Devolution Cases) Order 1999 (S.I. 1999 No. 1320)
 The Swansea (1999) National Health Service Trust (Change of Name) Order 1999 (S.I. 1999 No. 1321)
 The Public Service Vehicles (Community Licences) Regulations 1999 (S.I. 1999 No. 1322)
 The Rules of the Air (Amendment) Regulations 1999 (S.I. 1999 No. 1323)
 The Air Navigation (General) (Second Amendment) Regulations 1999 (S.I. 1999 No. 1324)
 The Cambridgeshire (Coroners' Districts) (Amendment) Order 1999 (S.I. 1999 No. 1325)
 The Social Security (Hospital In-Patients, Attendance Allowance and Disability Living Allowance) (Amendment) Regulations 1999 (S.I. 1999 No. 1326)
 The Harrow College (Incorporation) Order 1999 (S.I. 1999 No.1327)
 The Harrow College (Government) Regulations 1999 (S.I. 1999 No. 1328)
 The Education (Nursery Education and Early Years Development) (England) Regulations 1999 (S.I. 1999 No. 1329)
 The Scotland Act 1998 (General Transitory, Transitional and Savings Provisions) Amendment Order 1999 (S.I. 1999 No. 1334)
 The Cattle Identification (Amendment) Regulations 1999 (S.I. 1999 No. 1339)
 The European Parliamentary Elections (Returning Officer's Charges) (Northern Ireland) Order 1999 (S.I. 1999 No. 1342)
 The Magistrates' Courts (Children and Young Persons) (Amendment) Rules 1999 (S.I. 1999 No. 1343 (L. 13))
 Act of Sederunt (Devolution Issues Rules) 1999 (S.I. 1999 No. 1345 (S.100))
 Act of Adjournal (Devolution Issues Rules) 1999 (S.I. 1999 No. 1346 (S.101))
 Act of Sederunt (Proceedings for Determination of Devolution Issues Rules) 1999 (S.I. 1999 No. 1347 (S.102))
 The Scotland Act 1998 (Transitory and Transitional Provisions) (Members' Interests) Order 1999 (S.I. 1999 No. 1350)
 The Scotland Act 1998 (Transitory and Transitional Provisions) (Complaints of Maladministration) Order 1999 (S.I. 1999 No. 1351)
 The Election Petition (Amendment) Rules 1999 (S.I. 1999 No. 1352 (L. 14))
 The Port of London Authority Harbour Revision Order 1999 (S.I. 1999 No. 1353)
 The A406 Trunk Road (Barnet) Red Route (Clearway) Traffic Order 1996 Variation Order 1999 (S.I. 1999 No. 1359)
 The Food Safety (General Food Hygiene) (Amendment) Regulations 1999 (S.I. 1999 No. 1360)
 The Producer Responsibility Obligations (Packaging Waste) (Amendment) Regulations 1999 (S.I. 1999 No. 1361)
 The Social Security (Overlapping Benefits) Amendment (No. 2) Regulations 1999 (S.I. 1999 No. 1362)
 The Environmentally Sensitive Areas (Lake District) Designation (Amendment) Order 1999 (S.I. 1999 No. 1363)
 The Environmentally Sensitive Areas (Breckland) Designation (Amendment) Order 1999 (S.I. 1999 No. 1364)
 The Environmentally Sensitive Areas (Test Valley) Designation (Amendment) Order 1999 (S.I. 1999 No. 1365)
 The Environmentally Sensitive Areas (North Kent Marshes) Designation (Amendment) Order 1999 (S.I. 1999 No. 1366)
 The Environmentally Sensitive Areas (North Peak) Designation (Amendment) Order 1999 (S.I. 1999 No. 1367)
 The Environmentally Sensitive Areas (Avon Valley) Designation (Amendment) Order 1999 (S.I. 1999 No. 1368)
 The Environmentally Sensitive Areas (Clun) Designation (Amendment) Order 1999 (S.I. 1999 No. 1369)
 The Environmentally Sensitive Areas (South Wessex Downs) Designation (Amendment) Order 1999 (S.I. 1999 No. 1370)
 The Environmentally Sensitive Areas (Exmoor) Designation (Amendment) Order 1999 (S.I. 1999 No. 1371)
 The Environmentally Sensitive Areas (Suffolk River Valleys) Designation (Amendment) Order 1999 (S.I. 1999 No. 1372)
 The European Specialist Medical Qualifications Amendment Regulations 1999 (S.I. 1999 No. 1373)
 The Value Added Tax (Amendment) (No.3) Regulations 1999 (S.I. 1999 No. 1374)
 The Legal Aid in Criminal and Care Proceedings (Costs) (Amendment) (No. 2) Regulations 1999 (S.I. 1999 No. 1375)
 The Council of the City of York (Millennium Bridge) Scheme 1998 Confirmation Instrument 1999 (S.I. 1999 No. 1376)
 The European Parliamentary Elections (Local Returning Officers' Charges) Order 1999 (S.I. 1999 No. 1377)
 The European Parliamentary Elections (Returning Officers' Charges) Order 1999 (S.I. 1999 No. 1378)
 The Scotland Act 1998 (Transitory and Transitional Provisions) (Publication and Interpretation etc. of Acts of the Scottish Parliament) Order 1999 (S.I. 1999 No. 1379)
 The North and West Salmon Fishery District Designation Order 1999 (S.I. 1999 No. 1380 (S. 103))
 The Conon Salmon Fishery District Designation Order 1999 (S.I. 1999 No. 1381 (S. 104))
 The Lochaber Salmon Fishery District Designation Order 1999 (S.I. 1999 No. 1382 (S. 105))
 The Pathfinder National Health Service Trust (Change of Name) Order 1999 (S.I. 1999 No. 1384)
 The Education (Al-Furqan Primary School, Tyseley) (Exemption from Pay and Conditions) Order 1999 (S.I. 1999 No. 1385)
 Act of Sederunt (Rules of the Court of Session Amendment No. 5) (Miscellaneous) 1999 (S.I. 1999 No. 1386 (S.106))
 Act of Adjournal (Criminal Procedure Rules Amendment No. 3) 1999 (S.I. 1999 No. 1387 (S.107))
 The Walsgrave Hospitals National Health Service Trust (Establishment) Amendment Order 1999 (S.I. 1999 No. 1392)
 The European Parliamentary Election Petition (Amendment) Rules 1999 (S.I. 1999 No. 1398 (L. 15))

1401-1500

 The European Parliamentary Elections (Welsh Forms) (Amendment) Order 1999 (S.I. 1999 No. 1402)
 The Misuse of Drugs (Safe Custody) (Amendment) Regulations 1999 (S.I. 1999 No. 1403)
 The Misuse of Drugs (Amendment) Regulations 1999 (S.I. 1999 No. 1404)
 The Local Government Act 1988 (Defined Activities) (Exemption) (Tower Hamlets London Borough Council) Order 1999 (S.I. 1999 No. 1405)
 The Education (Governors' Annual Reports) (Wales) Regulations 1999 (S.I. 1999 No. 1406)
 The Education (Annual Parents' Meetings) (Wales) Regulations 1999 (S.I. 1999 No. 1407)
 The Non-resident Companies (General Insurance Business) Regulations 1999 (S.I. 1999 No. 1408)
 The Local Authority (Stocks and Bonds) (Amendment) Regulations 1999 (S.I. 1999 No. 1409)
 The Government Stock (Amendment) Regulations 1999 (S.I. 1999 No. 1410)
 The Income Support (General) (Standard Interest Rate Amendment) (No. 5) Regulations 1999 (S.I. 1999 No. 1411)
 The Civil Aviation (Navigation Services Charges) (Third Amendment) Regulations 1999 (S.I. 1999 No. 1412)
 The Potato Industry Development Council (Amendment) Order 1999 (S.I. 1999 No. 1413)
 The Radcliffe Infirmary National Health Service Trust (Dissolution) Order 1999 (S.I. 1999 No. 1414)
 The Police (Secretary of State's Objectives) (No. 2) Order 1999 (S.I. 1999 No. 1415)
 The M32 Motorway (Hambrook Interchange to Lower Ashley Road Interchange) and Connecting Roads Scheme 1989 (Variation) Scheme 1999 (S.I. 1999 No. 1416)
 The Unfair Dismissal and Statement of Reasons for Dismissal (Variation of Qualifying Period) Order 1999 (S.I. 1999 No. 1436)
 The Northern Ireland (Location of Victims' Remains) Act 1999 (Immunities and Privileges) Order 1999 (S.I. 1999 No. 1437)
 The Protection of Wrecks (Designation) Order 1999 (S.I. 1999 No.1438)
 The Education Development Plans (Wales) Regulations 1999 (S.I. 1999 No. 1439)
 The Education (School Inspection) (Wales) (Amendment) Regulations 1999 (S.I. 1999 No. 1440)
 The Education (Inspection of Nursery Education) (Wales) Regulations 1999 (S.I. 1999 No. 1441)
 The Education (Special Educational Needs) (Information) (Wales) Regulations 1999 (S.I. 1999 No. 1442)
 The Railways Act 1993 (Consequential Modifications) Order 1999 (S.I. 1999 No. 1443)
 The Rail Vehicle Accessibility (LTS Rail Class 357 Vehicles) Exemption Order 1999 (S.I. 1999 No. 1448)
 The A30 Trunk Road (Woodleigh Junction Slip Roads) Order 1999 (S.I. 1999 No. 1451)
 The Aeroplane Noise Regulations 1999 (S.I. 1999 No. 1452)
 The Judicial Pensions and Retirement Act 1993 (Addition of Qualifying Judicial Offices) Order 1999 (S.I. 1999 No. 1454)
 The Social Security and Child Support (Decisions and Appeals) (Amendment) Regulations 1999 (S.I. 1999 No. 1466)
 The Stamp Duty and Stamp Duty Reserve Tax (Open-ended Investment Companies) (Amendment) Regulations 1999 (S.I. 1999 No. 1467)
 The Horserace Betting Levy (Bookmakers' Committee) Regulations 1999 (S.I. 1999 No. 1468)
 The Education (Schedule 32 to the School Standards and Framework Act 1998) (Wales) Regulations 1999 (S.I. 1999 No. 1469)
 The Education (School Performance Information) (Wales) (Amendment) Regulations 1999 (S.I. 1999 No. 1470)
 The A1 Trunk Road (Islington) Red Route Traffic Order 1993 Variation Order (No. 2) 1999 (S.I. 1999 No. 1475)
 The A1 Trunk Road (Islington) Red Route (Bus Priority) Traffic Order 1999 (S.I. 1999 No. 1476)
 The Adoption (Amendment) Rules 1999 (S.I. 1999 No. 1477 (L. 16))
 The Food Labelling (Amendment) (No. 2) Regulations 1999 (S.I. 1999 No. 1483)
 The A1 Trunk Road (Islington) (Temporary Prohibition of Traffic) Order 1999 (S.I. 1999 No. 1484)
 The A50 Trunk Road (Uttoxeter Service Area, Staffordshire) Order 1999 (S.I. 1999 No. 1492)
 The M32 Motorway (Junction Two, Northbound Exit Slip Road, Special Road) (Detrunking) Order 1999 (S.I. 1999 No. 1493)
 The Education (Mandatory Awards) Regulations 1999 (S.I. 1999 No. 1494)
 The Social Security Commissioners (Procedure) Regulations 1999 (S.I. 1999 No. 1495)
 The Chiropractors Act 1994 (Commencement No. 3) Order 1999 (S.I. 1999 No. 1496 (C. 41))
 The Education (Individual Pupils' Achievements) (Information) (Wales) (Amendment) Regulations 1999 (S.I. 1999 No. 1497)
 The School Standards and Framework Act 1998 (Appointed Day) (Wales) Order 1999 (S.I. 1999 No. 1498 (C. 46))
 The Criminal Justice Act 1993 (Commencement No. 11) Order 1999 (S.I. 1999 No. 1499 (C. 42))

1501-1600

 The Foundation Body Regulations 1999 (S.I. 1999 No. 1502)
 The Education (Grants) (Music, Ballet and Choir Schools) (Amendment) Regulations 1999 (S.I. 1999 No. 1503)
 The Education (Assisted Places) (Amendment) Regulations 1999 (S.I. 1999 No. 1504)
 The Education (Assisted Places) (Incidental Expenses) (Amendment) Regulations 1999 (S.I. 1999 No. 1505)
 The Water Supply (Water Fittings) (Amendment) Regulations 1999 (S.I. 1999 No. 1506)
 The Combined Probation Areas (Humberside) Order 1999 (S.I. 1999 No. 1507)
 The Social Security Amendment (Non-Cash Vouchers) Regulations 1999 (S.I. 1999 No. 1509)
 The Social Security Act 1998 (Commencement No. 7 and Consequential and Transitional Provisions) Order 1999 (S.I. 1999 No. 1510 (C.43)])
 The Northern Ireland (Location of Victims' Remains) Act 1999 (Commencement of Section 2) Order 1999 (S.I. 1999 No. 1511 (C. 44)])
 The Scotland Act 1998 (Agency Arrangements) (Specification) Order 1999 (S.I. 1999 No. 1512)
 The Olive Oil (Designations of Origin) Regulations 1999 (S.I. 1999 No. 1513)
 The Smoke Control Areas (Exempted Fireplaces) Order 1999 (S.I. 1999 No. 1515)
 The Federal Republic of Yugoslavia (Supply, Sale and Export of Petroleum and Petroleum Products) (No. 2) Regulations 1999 (S.I. 1999 No. 1516)
 The Energy Information (Lamps) Regulations 1999 (S.I. 1999 No. 1517)
 The Road Vehicles (Construction and Use) (Amendment) Regulations 1999 (S.I. 1999 No. 1521)
 The Council Tax (Exempt Dwellings) (Amendment) (No. 2) Order 1999 (S.I. 1999 No. 1522)
 The Housing Renewal Grants (Amendment) Regulations 1999 (S.I. 1999 No. 1523)
 The Water Supply (Water Quality) (Amendment) Regulations 1999 (S.I. 1999 No. 1524)
 The Feeding Stuffs (Amendment) Regulations 1999 (S.I. 1999 No. 1528)
 The General Chiropractic Council (Constitution and Procedure) Rules Order 1999 (S.I. 1999 No. 1537)
 The Local Government Act 1988 (Defined Activities) (Exemptions) (Bournemouth, Harrogate, Poole and Worthing Borough Councils) Order 1999 (S.I. 1999 No. 1538)
 The Housing Benefit and Council Tax Benefit (General) Amendment (No.2) Regulations 1999 (S.I. 1999 No. 1539)
 The Natural Mineral Water, Spring Water and Bottled Drinking Water Regulations 1999 (S.I. 1999 No. 1540)
 The Relocation Grants (Form of Application) (Amendment) Regulations 1999 (S.I. 1999 No. 1541)
 The Food (Animals and Animal Products from Belgium) (Emergency Control) Order 1999 (S.I. 1999 No. 1542)
 The Animal Feedingstuffs from Belgium (Control) Regulations 1999 (S.I. 1999 No. 1543)
 The Civil Aviation (Route Charges for Navigation Services) (Third Amendment) Regulations 1999 (S.I. 1999 No. 1544)
 The National Assembly for Wales (Local Government (Contracts) Act 1997) (Modifications) Order 1999 (S.I. 1999 No. 1545)
 The Water and Sewerage Undertakers (Pipelaying and Other Works) (Code of Practice) Order 1999 (S.I. 1999 No. 1546)
 The Public Interest Disclosure Act 1998 (Commencement) Order 1999 (S.I. 1999 No. 1547 (C. 45)])
 The Public Interest Disclosure (Compensation) Regulations 1999 (S.I. 1999 No. 1548)
 The Public Interest Disclosure (Prescribed Persons) Order 1999 (S.I. 1999 No. 1549)
 The Cosmetic Products (Safety) (Amendment) Regulations 1999 (S.I. 1999 No. 1552)
 The Seeds (Fees) (Amendment) Regulations 1999 (S.I. 1999 No. 1553)
 The Bovines and Bovine Products (Trade) (Amendment) Regulations 1999 (S.I. 1999 No. 1554)
 The Railtrack (Luton Parkway Station: Land Acquisition) Order 1999 (S.I. 1999 No. 1555)
 The A638 Trunk Road (North Of Doncaster, Redhouse To County Boundary) (Detrunking) Order 1999 (S.I. 1999 No. 1556)
 The National Lottery etc. Act 1993 (Amendment of Section 23) Order 1999 (S.I. 1999 No. 1563)
 The Excise Goods (Sales on Board Ships and Aircraft) Regulations 1999 (S.I. 1999 No. 1565)
 The Value Added Tax (Chiropractors) Order 1999 (S.I. 1999 No. 1575)
 The Financial Services Act 1986 (Overseas Investment Exchanges and Overseas Clearing Houses) (Periodical Fees) Regulations 1999 (S.I. 1999 No. 1576)
 The Home-Grown Cereals Authority (Rate of Levy) Order 1999 (S.I. 1999 No. 1577)
 The Food Safety (Fishery Products and Live Shellfish) (Hygiene) Amendment (No. 2) Regulations 1999 (S.I. 1999 No. 1585)
 The Scotland Act 1998 (Concurrent Functions) Order 1999 (S.I. 1999 No. 1592)
 The Scotland Act 1998 (Transitory and Transitional Provisions) (Orders subject to Special Parliamentary Procedure) Order 1999 (S.I. 1999 No. 1593)
 The Scotland Act 1998 (Transitory and Transitional Provisions) (Laying of Reports) Order 1999 (S.I. 1999 No. 1594)
 The Scotland Act 1998 (Transitory and Transitional Provisions) (Complaints of Maladministration) Amendment Order 1999 (S.I. 1999 No. 1595)
 The Scotland Act 1998 (Transfer of Borrowing of the Registers of Scotland Executive Agency Trading Fund) Order 1999 (S.I. 1999 No. 1596)

1601-1700

 The Goods Infringing Intellectual Property Rights (Customs) Regulations 1999 (S.I. 1999 No. 1601)
 The Contaminants in Food (Amendment) Regulations 1999 (S.I. 1999 No. 1603)
 The National Health Service (Indicative Amounts) (Amendment) Regulations 1999 (S.I. 1999 No. 1606)
 The Housing Renewal Grants (Prescribed Form and Particulars) (Amendment) Regulations 1999 (S.I. 1999 No. 1607)
 The Road Traffic Regulation Act 1984 (Amendment) Order 1999 (S.I. 1999 No. 1608)
 The Magistrates' Courts Committees (West Glamorgan and South Wales) Amalgamation Order 1999 (S.I. 1999 No. 1609)
 The Army Terms of Service (Amendment) Regulations 1999 (S.I. 1999 No. 1610)
 The National Savings Bank (Amendment) (No. 2) Regulations 1999 (S.I. 1999 No. 1611)
 The Public Record Office (Fees) (Amendment) Regulations 1999 (S.I. 1999 No. 1616)
 The Excise Duties (Personal Reliefs) (Amendment) Order 1999 (S.I. 1999 No. 1617)
 The Goods Infringing Intellectual Property Rights (Consequential Provisions) Regulations 1999 (S.I. 1999 No. 1618)
 The General Teaching Council for Wales (Constitution) Regulations 1999 (S.I. 1999 No. 1619)
 The National Health Service (General Medical Services) (Scotland) Amendment (No.3) Regulations 1999 (S.I. 1999 No. 1620 (S. 108)])
 The Registration of Marriages (Welsh Language) Regulations 1999 (S.I. 1999 No. 1621)
 The Welfare of Animals (Transport) (Amendment) Order 1999 (S.I. 1999 No. 1622)
 The Social Security and Child Support (Decisions and Appeals) Amendment (No. 2) Regulations 1999 (S.I. 1999 No. 1623)
 The National Health Service (General Medical Services) Amendment (No. 2) Regulations 1999 (S.I. 1999 No. 1627)
 The Public Telecommunication System Designation (Axxon Telecom Limited) Order 1999 (S.I. 1999 No. 1628)
 The Public Telecommunication System Designation (Cyberlight Europe Plc) Order 1999 (S.I. 1999 No. 1629)
 The Public Telecommunication System Designation (NTT Europe Limited) Order 1999 (S.I. 1999 No. 1630)
 The Public Telecommunication System Designation (Japan Telecom UK Limited) Order 1999 (S.I. 1999 No. 1631)
 The Public Telecommunication System Designation (Jersey Telecoms) Order 1999 (S.I. 1999 No. 1632)
 The Public Telecommunication System Designation (City Telecom (HK) Limited) Order 1999 (S.I. 1999 No. 1633)
 The Public Telecommunication System Designation (Alpha Telecom Limited) Order 1999 (S.I. 1999 No. 1634)
 The Public Telecommunication System Designation (International Optical Network Limited) Order 1999 (S.I. 1999 No. 1635)
 The Public Telecommunication System Designation (Belgacom UK Limited) Order 1999 (S.I. 1999 No. 1636)
 The Public Telecommunication System Designation (Call-Net (UK) Limited) Order 1999 (S.I. 1999 No. 1637)
 The Public Telecommunication System Designation (Flute Limited) Order 1999 (S.I. 1999 No. 1638)
 The Public Telecommunication System Designation (Zereau Limited) Order 1999 (S.I. 1999 No. 1639)
 The Public Telecommunication System Designation (Eurotunnel Telecommunications Limited) Order 1999 (S.I. 1999 No. 1640)
 The Driving Licences (Exchangeable Licences) Order 1999 (S.I. 1999 No. 1641)
 The Value Added Tax (Abolition of Zero-Rating for Tax-Free Shops) Order 1999 (S.I. 1999 No. 1642)
 The Insurance Companies (Loan Relationships) (Election for Accruals Basis) Order 1999 (S.I. 1999 No. 1643)
 The Merchant Shipping (Additional Safety Measures for Bulk Carriers) Regulations 1999 (S.I. 1999 No. 1644)
 The M6 Motorway (Junction 38 Slip Roads) (Speed Limit) Regulations 1999 (S.I. 1999 No. 1646)
 The Town and Country Planning (General Permitted Development) (Amendment) Order 1999 (S.I. 1999 No. 1661)
 The Social Security Contributions (Transfer of Functions, etc.) Act 1999 (Commencement No. 2 and Consequential and Transitional Provisions) Order 1999 (S.I. 1999 No. 1662 (C.47)])
 The Feeding Stuffs (Sampling and Analysis) Regulations 1999 (S.I. 1999 No. 1663)
 The Gateshead (Baltic Millennium Bridge) Order 1999 (S.I. 1999 No. 1664)
 The Local Government Officers (Political Restrictions) (Wales) (Amendment) Regulations 1999 (S.I. 1999 No. 1665)
 The Road Traffic (Permitted Parking Area and Special Parking Area) (Borough of Luton) (Amendment) Order 1999 (S.I. 1999 No. 1666)
 The Road Traffic (Permitted Parking Area and Special Parking Area) (County of Buckinghamshire) (High Wycombe Town Centre) (Amendment) Order 1999 (S.I. 1999 No. 1667)
 The Road Traffic (Permitted Parking Areas and Special Parking Areas) (City of Oxford and Parish of North Hinksey) (Amendment) Order 1999 (S.I. 1999 No. 1668)
 The Road Traffic (Permitted Parking Area and Special Parking Area) (County of Hertfordshire) (Borough of Watford) (Amendment) Order 1999 (S.I. 1999 No. 1669)
 The Social Security and Child Support (Decisions and Appeals) Amendment (No. 3) Regulations 1999 (S.I. 1999 No. 1670)
 The Education (School Organisation Proposals) (Wales) Regulations 1999 (S.I. 1999 No. 1671)
 The Public Gas Transporter Pipe-line Works (Environmental Impact Assessment) Regulations 1999 (S.I. 1999 No. 1672)
 The Energy Information (Dishwashers) Regulations 1999 (S.I. 1999 No. 1676)
 The Social Security Amendment (Educational Maintenance Allowance) Regulations 1999 (S.I. 1999 No. 1677)

1701-1800

 The Merchant Shipping (Minimum Standards of Safety Communications) (Amendment) Regulations 1999 (S.I. 1999 No. 1704)
 The Magistrates' Courts Committees (Hereford and Worcester and Shropshire) Amalgamation Order 1999 (S.I. 1999 No. 1705)
 The A205 Trunk Road (Lewisham) Red Route (Prescribed Route) Traffic Order 1999 (S.I. 1999 No. 1706)
 The A205 Trunk Road (Lewisham) Red Route (Bus Lanes) Experimental Traffic Order 1998 Variation Order 1999 (S.I. 1999 No. 1707)
 The Tollesbury and Mersea (Blackwater) Fishery Order 1999 (S.I. 1999 No. 1708)
 The Northern Ireland (Emergency and Prevention of Terrorism Provisions) (Continuance) Order 1999 (S.I. 1999 No. 1709)
 The Traffic Signs General (Amendment) Directions 1999 (S.I. 1999 No. 1723)
 The A23 Trunk Road (Lambeth) Red Route Traffic Order 1999 (S.I. 1999 No. 1724)
 The A35 Trunk Road (Chideock Morcombelake Bypass) Order 1996 (Revocation Order) 1999 (S.I. 1999 No. 1725)
 The General Teaching Council for England (Constitution) Regulations 1999 (S.I. 1999 No. 1726)
 The Local Education Authority (Payment of School Expenses) Regulations 1999 (S.I. 1999 No. 1727)
 The Agreed Syllabus for Religious Education (Prescribed Period) Order 1999 (S.I. 1999 No. 1728)
 The Army, Air Force and Naval Discipline Acts (Continuation) Order 1999 (S.I. 1999 No. 1734)
 The International Headquarters and Defence Organisations (Designation and Privileges) (Amendment) Order 1999 (S.I. 1999 No. 1735)
 The Visiting Forces and International Headquarters (Application of Law) Order 1999 (S.I. 1999 No. 1736)
 The Carriage by Air Acts (Application of Provisions) (Fifth Amendment) Order 1999 (S.I. 1999 No. 1737)
 The European Communities (Definition of Treaties) (Economic Partnership, Political Coordination and Cooperation Agreement between the European Community and its Member States and the United Mexican States) Order 1999 (S.I. 1999 No. 1738)
 The European Communities (Definition of Treaties) (Euro-Mediterranean Agreement establishing an Association between the European Communities and their Member States and the Hashemite Kingdom of Jordan) Order 1999 (S.I. 1999 No. 1739)
 The European Communities (Definition of Treaties) (Framework Agreement for Trade and Cooperation between the European Community and its Member States and the Republic of Korea) Order 1999 (S.I. 1999 No. 1740)
 The Fishery Limits Order 1999 (S.I. 1999 No. 1741)
 The Appropriation (No. 2) (Northern Ireland) Order 1999 (S.I. 1999 No. 1742 (N.I. 7)])
 The Geneva Conventions Act (Isle of Man) Order 1999 (S.I. 1999 No. 1743)
 The Geneva Conventions Act (Jersey) Order 1999 (S.I. 1999 No. 1744)
 The Scottish Parliament (Assistance for Registered Political Parties) Order 1999 (S.I. 1999 No. 1745)
 The Scotland Act 1998 (Border Rivers) Order 1999 (S.I. 1999 No. 1746)
 The Scotland Act 1998 (Cross-Border Public Authorities) (Adaptation of Functions etc.) Order 1999 (S.I. 1999 No. 1747)
 The Scotland Act 1998 (Functions Exercisable in or as Regards Scotland) Order 1999 (S.I. 1999 No. 1748)
 The Scotland Act 1998 (Modifications of Schedules 4 and 5) Order 1999 (S.I. 1999 No. 1749)
 The Scotland Act 1998 (Transfer of Functions to the Scottish Ministers etc.) Order 1999 (S.I. 1999 No. 1750)
 The Copyright (Application to Other Countries) Order 1999 (S.I. 1999 No. 1751)
 The Performances (Reciprocal Protection) (Convention Countries) Order 1999 (S.I. 1999 No. 1752)
 The Northern Ireland Act 1998 (Commencement No. 2) Order 1999 (S.I. 1999 No. 1753 (C. 48)])
 The Local Authorities (Goods and Services) (Public Bodies) (No. 2) Order 1999 (S.I. 1999 No. 1754)
 The Scotland Act 1998 (Modification of Functions) Order 1999 (S.I. 1999 No. 1756)
 The Protection from Eviction (Excluded Licences) (The Shaftesbury Society) Order 1999 (S.I. 1999 No. 1758)
 The Food (Animals and Animal Products from Belgium) (Emergency Control) (Amendment) Order 1999 (S.I. 1999 No. 1763)
 The Animal Feedingstuffs from Belgium (Control) (Amendment) Regulations 1999 (S.I. 1999 No. 1764)
 The Planning and Compensation Act 1991 (Amendment of Schedule 18) (No. 2) Order 1999 (S.I. 1999 No. 1765)
 The Scottish Parliamentary Elections (Returning Officers' Charges) Amendment Order 1999 (S.I. 1999 No. 1766)
 The Osteopaths Act 1993 (Commencement No. 4) Order 1999 (S.I. 1999 No. 1767 (C. 49)])
 The Mount Vernon and Watford Hospitals National Health Service Trust (Establishment) Amendment Order 1999 (S.I. 1999 No. 1768)
 The Hillingdon Hospital National Health Service Trust (Establishment) Amendment Order 1999 (S.I. 1999 No. 1769)
 The Wiltshire and Swindon Health Care National Health Service Trust (Establishment) Order 1999 (S.I. 1999 No. 1770)
 The Wiltshire Health Care and the East Wiltshire Health Care National Health Service Trusts (Dissolution) Order 1999 (S.I. 1999 No. 1771)
 The Newham Community Health Services National Health Service Trust (Establishment) Amendment Order 1999 (S.I. 1999 No. 1773)
 The Wireless Telegraphy (Licence Charges) Regulations 1999 (S.I. 1999 No. 1774)
 The Federal Republic of Yugoslavia (Supply and Sale of Equipment) (Penalties and Licences) (Amendment) Regulations 1999 (S.I. 1999 No. 1775)
 The Export of Goods (Control) (Iraq and Kuwait Sanctions) (Amendment) Order 1999 (S.I. 1999 No. 1776)
 The Export of Goods (Control) (Amendment No. 3) Order 1999 (S.I. 1999 No. 1777)
 The Dual-Use and Related Goods (Export Control) (Amendment No. 2) Regulations 1999 (S.I. 1999 No. 1778)
 The Education (Transfer of Functions Concerning School Lunches) (Wales) (No. 2) Order 1999 (S.I. 1999 No. 1779)
 The Education (Maintained Special Schools) (Wales) Regulations 1999 (S.I. 1999 No. 1780)
 The Education (Individual Pupil Information) (Prescribed Persons) (Wales) Regulations 1999 (S.I. 1999 No. 1781)
 The Local Government Reorganisation (Wales) (Capital Finance) (Amendment) Order 1999 (S.I. 1999 No. 1782)
 The Environmental Impact Assessment (Land Drainage Improvement Works) Regulations 1999 (S.I. 1999 No. 1783)
 The Education (Student Loans) (Amendment) Regulations 1999 (S.I. 1999 No. 1784)
 Act of Sederunt (Rules of the Court of Session Amendment No.6) (Causes Relating to Intellectual Property) 1999 (S.I. 1999 No. 1785 (S.109)])
 The Federal Republic of Yugoslavia (Freezing of Funds and Prohibition on Investment) Regulations 1999 (S.I. 1999 No. 1786)
 The Government of Wales Act (Complaints of Maladministration) (Transitional and Saving Provisions) Order 1999 (S.I. 1999 No. 1791)
 The Food (Peanuts from Egypt) (Emergency Control) Order 1999 (S.I. 1999 No. 1800)

1801-1900

 The Marketing of Ornamental Plant Propagating Material Regulations 1999 (S.I. 1999 No. 1801)
 The Charles Keene College of Further Education, Leicester and Leicester South Fields College (Dissolution) Order 1999 (S.I. 1999 No. 1802)
 The Assured and Protected Tenancies (Lettings to Students) (Amendment) Regulations 1999 (S.I. 1999 No. 1803)
 The Equality Commission for Northern Ireland (Supplementary Provisions) (Northern Ireland) Order 1999 (S.I. 1999 No. 1804)
 The A205 Trunk Road (Southwark) Red Route Traffic Order 1999 (S.I. 1999 No. 1805)
 The Town and Country Planning (Control of Advertisements) (Amendment) Regulations 1999 (S.I. 1999 No. 1810)
 The Education (School Performance and Unauthorised Absence Targets) (Wales) Regulations 1999 (S.I. 1999 No. 1811)
 The Education (School Information) (Wales) Regulations 1999 (S.I. 1999 No. 1812)
 The Prevention of Terrorism (Temporary Provisions) Act 1989 (Revival of Parts IVA and IVB) Order 1999 (S.I. 1999 No. 1813)
 The Designation of Schools Having a Religious Character (Wales) Order 1999 (S.I. 1999 No. 1814)
 The Education (National Curriculum) (Temporary Exceptions for Individual Pupils) (Wales) Regulations 1999 (S.I. 1999 No. 1815)
 The Late Payment of Commercial Debts (Interest) Act 1998 (Commencement No. 2) Order 1999 (S.I. 1999 No. 1816 (C. 50)])
 The Potato Marketing Board (Dissolution) Order 1999 (S.I. 1999 No. 1817)
 The Scotland Act 1998 (Consequential Modifications) (No.2) Order 1999 (S.I. 1999 No. 1820)
 The Royal Hospital of St. Bartholomew, the Royal London Hospital and London Chest Hospital National Health Service Trust (Change of Name) Order 1999 (S.I. 1999 No. 1823)
 The Education (Mandatory Awards) (Amendment) Regulations 1999 (S.I. 1999 No. 1824)
 The Leicestershire and Rutland Healthcare National Health Service Trust (Establishment) Amendment Order 1999 (S.I. 1999 No. 1825)
 The Road Traffic (NHS Charges) (Scotland) Order 1999 (S.I. 1999 No. 1842 (S.110)])
 The Road Traffic (NHS Charges) (Reviews and Appeals) (Scotland) Regulations 1999 (S.I. 1999 No. 1843 (S. 111)])
 The Cigarette Lighter Refill (Safety) Regulations 1999 (S.I. 1999 No. 1844)
 Register of County Court Judgments (Amendment) Regulations 1999 (S.I. 1999 No. 1845 (L. 17)])
 The General Osteopathic Council (Fraud or Error and Appeals) Rules Order of Council 1999 (S.I. 1999 No. 1846)
 The General Osteopathic Council (Investigation of Complaints) (Procedure) Rules Order of Council 1999 (S.I. 1999 No. 1847)
 The General Osteopathic Council (Legal Assessors) Rules Order of Council 1999 (S.I. 1999 No. 1848)
 The Occupational Pension Schemes (Investment, and Assignment, Forfeiture, Bankruptcy etc.) Amendment Regulations 1999 (S.I. 1999 No. 1849)
 The Fixed Penalty Offences Order 1999 (S.I. 1999 No. 1851)
 The Local Authorities (Capital Finance and Approved Investments) (Amendment) Regulations 1999 (S.I. 1999 No. 1852)
 The Professions Supplementary to Medicine (Paramedics Board) Order of Council 1999 (S.I. 1999 No. 1853)
 The Professions Supplementary to Medicine (Clinical Scientists Board) Order of Council 1999 (S.I. 1999 No. 1854)
 The Professions Supplementary to Medicine (Speech and Language Therapists Board) Order of Council 1999 (S.I. 1999 No. 1855)
 The General Chiropractic Council (Registration) Rules Order of Council 1999 (S.I. 1999 No. 1856)
 The General Chiropractic Council (Registration During Transitional Period) Rules Order of Council 1999 (S.I. 1999 No. 1857)
 The East Kent Hospitals National Health Service Trust (Establishment) Amendment Order 1999 (S.I. 1999 No. 1858)
 The Civil Aviation (Route Charges For Navigation Services) (Third Amendment) (Revocation) Regulations 1999 (S.I. 1999 No. 1859)
 The Cereal Seeds (Amendment) Regulations 1999 (S.I. 1999 No. 1860)
 The Beet Seeds (Amendment) Regulations 1999 (S.I. 1999 No. 1861)
 The Oil and Fibre Plant Seeds (Amendment) Regulations 1999 (S.I. 1999 No. 1862)
 The Vegetable Seeds (Amendment) Regulations 1999 (S.I. 1999 No. 1863)
 The Fodder Plant Seeds (Amendment) Regulations 1999 (S.I. 1999 No. 1864)
 The Seeds (Fees) (Amendment) (No. 2) Regulations 1999 (S.I. 1999 No. 1865)
 The Education (Further Education in Schools) Regulations 1999 (S.I. 1999 No. 1867)
 The Education (Exclusion from School) (Prescribed Periods) Regulations 1999 (S.I. 1999 No. 1868)
 The Merchant Shipping (Counting and Registration of Persons on Board Passenger Ships) Regulations 1999 (S.I. 1999 No. 1869)
 The Combined Probation Areas (Lincolnshire) Order 1999 (S.I. 1999 No. 1870)
 The Feedingstuffs (Zootechnical Products) Regulations 1999 (S.I. 1999 No. 1871)
 The Feeding Stuffs (Establishments and Intermediaries) Regulations 1999 (S.I. 1999 No. 1872)
 The Tayside Primary Care National Health Service Trust (Establishment) Amendment Order 1999 (S.I. 1999 No. 1875 (S. 112)])
 The Cross-Border Credit Transfers Regulations 1999 (S.I. 1999 No. 1876)
 The Fire Precautions (Workplace) (Amendment) Regulations 1999 (S.I. 1999 No. 1877)
 The National Lottery Charities Board (Increase in Membership) (Revocation) Order 1999 (S.I. 1999 No. 1878)
The General Osteopathic Council (Medical Assessors) Rules Order of Council 1999 (S.I. 1999 No. 1879)* The Social Fund Winter Fuel Payment Amendment Regulations 1999 ([http://www.legislation.gov.uk/uksi/1999/1880/contents/made S.I. 1999 No. 1880)
 The Scotland Act 1998 (Transitory and Transitional Provisions) (Grants to Members and Officeholders and Scottish Parliamentary Pension Scheme) Amendment Order 1999 (S.I. 1999 No. 1891)
 The Town and Country Planning (Trees) Regulations 1999 (S.I. 1999 No. 1892)
 The Patents and Trade Marks (World Trade Organisation) Regulations 1999 (S.I. 1999 No. 1899)
 The Education (Parent Governor Representatives) (Wales) Regulations 1999 (S.I. 1999 No. 1900)

1901-2000

 The Health Authorities (Membership and Procedure) Amendment (Wales) Regulations 1999 (S.I. 1999 No. 1901)
 The National Health Service (Functions of Health Authorities and Administration Arrangements) Amendment (Wales) Regulations 1999 (S.I. 1999 No. 1902)
 The A40 Trunk Road (Old Oak Common Lane And Old Oak Road, Ealing And Hammersmith And Fulham) (Prohibition Of Traffic Movements) Order 1999 (S.I. 1999 No. 1914)
 The Road Traffic (Parking Adjudicators) (England and Wales) Regulations 1999 (S.I. 1999 No. 1918)
 The Greenhill College, Harrow and Weald College, Harrow (Dissolution) Order 1999 (S.I. 1999 No. 1919)
 The Income Support (General) and Jobseeker's Allowance Amendment Regulations 1999 (S.I. 1999 No. 1921)
 The Merchant Shipping (Liability of Shipowners and Others) (Rate Of Interest) Order 1999 (S.I. 1999 No. 1922)
 The Merchant Shipping (Fees) (Amendment No. 2) Regulations 1999 (S.I. 1999 No. 1923)
 The Collective Redundancies and Transfer of Undertakings (Protection of Employment) (Amendment) Regulations 1999 (S.I. 1999 No. 1925)
 The Football Spectators (Seating) Order 1999 (S.I. 1999 No. 1926)
 The Double Taxation Relief (Taxes on Income) (General) (Dividend) (Revocation) Regulations 1999 (S.I. 1999 No. 1927)
 The Taxes (Interest Rate) (Amendment No. 2) Regulations 1999 (S.I. 1999 No. 1928)
 The Corporation Tax (Instalment Payments) (Amendment) Regulations 1999 (S.I. 1999 No. 1929)
 The Safety of Sports Grounds (Designation) Order 1999 (S.I. 1999 No. 1930)
 The Rail Vehicle Accessibility (Anglia Railways Class 170/2 Vehicles) Exemption Order 1999 (S.I. 1999 No. 1931)
 The Rail Vehicle Accessibility (Central Trains Class 170/5 Vehicles) Exemption Order 1999 (S.I. 1999 No. 1932)
 The Postal Privilege (Suspension) Order 1999 (S.I. 1999 No. 1933)
 The A30 Trunk Road (Tavistock Road Junction) (Detrunking) Order 1999 (S.I. 1999 No. 1934)
 The Social Security Amendment (Students) Regulations 1999 (S.I. 1999 No. 1935)
 The Education (Parent Governor Representatives) Regulations 1999 (S.I. 1999 No. 1949)
 The Capital Gains Tax (Definition of Permanent Interest Bearing Share) Regulations 1999 (S.I. 1999 No. 1953)
 The Education (Education Standards Etc. Grants) (England) Regulations 1999 (Amendment) Regulations 1999 (S.I. 1999 No. 1955)
 The Consumer Credit (Exempt Agreements) (Amendment) Order 1999 (S.I. 1999 No. 1956)
 The Merchant Shipping (Marine Equipment) Regulations 1999 (S.I. 1999 No. 1957)
 The Social Security Act 1998 (Commencement No. 8, and Savings and Consequential and Transitional Provisions) Order 1999 (S.I. 1999 No. 1958 (C.51)])
 The Road Vehicles (Construction and Use) (Amendment No. 2) Regulation 1999 (S.I. 1999 No. 1959)
 The Retirement Benefits Schemes (Continuation of Rights of Members of Approved Schemes) (Amendment) Regulations 1999 (S.I. 1999 No. 1963)
 The Retirement Benefits Schemes (Restriction on Discretion to Approve) (Additional Voluntary Contributions) (Amendment) Regulations 1999 (S.I. 1999 No. 1964)
 The Social Security (Contributions) (Amendment No. 4) Regulations 1999 (S.I. 1999 No. 1965)
 The Social Security (Contributions) (Amendment No. 4) (Northern Ireland) Regulations 1999 (S.I. 1999 No. 1966)
 The A13 Trunk Road (Tower Hamlets) Red Route Experimental Traffic Order 1998 Experimental Variation (No. 2) Order 1999 (S.I. 1999 No. 1974)
 The Channel Tunnel Rail Link (Nomination) (London Underground Works) Order 1999 (S.I. 1999 No. 1985)
 The A5 Trunk Road (Nesscliffe Bypass) Detrunking Order 1999 (S.I. 1999 No. 1986)
 The A5 Trunk Road (Nesscliffe Bypass) Order 1999 (S.I. 1999 No. 1987)
 The West Midlands (Coroners' Districts) (Amendment) Order 1999 (S.I. 1999 No. 1990)
 The A205 Trunk Road (Lewisham) Red Route Experimental Traffic Order 1998 Experimental Variation Order 1999 (S.I. 1999 No. 1991)
 The Disability Discrimination Code of Practice (Goods, Facilities, Services and Premises) Order 1999 (S.I. 1999 No. 1992)
 The Patent Office (Address) (Revocation) Rules 1999 (S.I. 1999 No. 1993)
 The Value Added Tax (Sport, Sports Competitions and Physical Education) Order 1999 (S.I. 1999 No. 1994)
 The New Northern Ireland Assembly (Salaries and Allowances) Order 1999 (S.I. 1999 No. 1995)
 The Independent Analogue Broadcasters (Reservation of Digital Capacity) (Amendment) Order 1999 (S.I. 1999 No. 1996)
 The Holme Lacy College (Dissolution) Order 1999 (S.I. 1999 No. 1997)
 The Railways Act 1993 (Consequential Modifications) (No. 2) Order 1999 (S.I. 1999 No. 1998)
 The Northern Ireland Act 1974 (Interim Period Extension) Order 1999 (S.I. 1999 No. 2000)

2001-2100

 The Pressure Equipment Regulations 1999 (S.I. 1999 No. 2001)
 The Magistrates' Courts (Reciprocal Enforcement of Maintenance Orders) (Hague Convention Countries) Rules 1999 (S.I. 1999 No. 2002 (L.17)])
 The Yugoslavia (Prohibition of Flights) Regulations 1999 (S.I. 1999 No. 2018)
 The General Teaching Council for England (Constitution) (Amendment) Regulations 1999 (S.I. 1999 No. 2019)
 The Education (Grants in respect of Voluntary Aided Schools) Regulations 1999 (S.I. 1999 No. 2020)
 The Education (Code of Practice on LEA – School Relations) (Appointed Day) (Wales) Order 1999 (S.I. 1999 No. 2022)
 The Local Government Act 1988 (Defined Activities) (Exemptions) (No. 1) (England) Order 1999 (S.I. 1999 No. 2023)
 The Quarries Regulations 1999 (S.I. 1999 No. 2024)
 The Food (Animals and Animal Products from Belgium) (Emergency Control) (England and Wales) Order 1999 (S.I. 1999 No. 2025)
 The Animal Feedingstuffs from Belgium (Control) (England and Wales) Regulations 1999 (S.I. 1999 No. 2026)
 The European Communities (Designation) (No. 2) Order 1999 (S.I. 1999 No. 2027)
 The Parliamentary Commissioner (No. 2) Order 1999 (S.I. 1999 No. 2028)
 The Dockyard Port of Plymouth Order 1999 (S.I. 1999 No. 2029)
 The Child Abduction and Custody (Parties to Conventions) (Amendment) Order 1999 (S.I. 1999 No. 2030)
 The Continental Shelf (Designation of Areas) Order 1999 (S.I. 1999 No. 2031)
 The INTELSAT (Immunities and Privileges) (Amendment) Order 1999 (S.I. 1999 No. 2032)
 The International Copper Study Group (Legal Capacities) Order 1999 (S.I. 1999 No. 2033)
 The International Organisations (Immunities and Privileges) Miscellaneous Provisions Order 1999 (S.I. 1999 No. 2034)
 The European Convention on Extradition Order 1990 (Amendment) Order 1999 (S.I. 1999 No. 2035)
 The Double Taxation Relief (Taxes on Income) (Kuwait) Order 1999 (S.I. 1999 No. 2036)
 The Ministerial and other Salaries Order 1999 (S.I. 1999 No. 2037)
 The Social Security (Transfer of Staff) (Northern Ireland) Order 1999 (S.I. 1999 No. 2038)
 The Education (Inspectors of Schools in Wales) (No. 3) Order 1999 (S.I. 1999 No. 2039)
 The Surrey County Council (New Temporary Road Bridge, Walton) Scheme 1998 Confirmation Instrument 1999 (S.I. 1999 No. 2058)
 The Air Navigation (Fifth Amendment) Order 1999 (S.I. 1999 No. 2059)
 The National Savings Bank (Investment Deposits) (Limits) (Amendment) (No. 2) Order 1999 (S.I. 1999 No. 2060)
 The North/South Co-operation (Implementation Bodies) (Amendment) (Northern Ireland) Order 1999 (S.I. 1999 No. 2062)
 The Landfill Tax (Site Restoration and Quarries) Order 1999 (S.I. 1999 No. 2075)
 The Value Added Tax (Refund of Tax) Order 1999 (S.I. 1999 No. 2076)
 The Motor Vehicles (Approval) (Amendment) Regulations 1999 (S.I. 1999 No. 2082)
 The Unfair Terms in Consumer Contracts Regulations 1999 (S.I. 1999 No. 2083)
 The Dangerous Substances and Preparations (Safety) (Consolidation) (Amendment) Regulations 1999 (S.I. 1999 No. 2084)
 The Redbridge Health Care National Health Service Trust (Establishment) Amendment Order 1999 (S.I. 1999 No. 2085)
 The Legal Advice and Assistance at Police Stations (Remuneration) (Amendment) Regulations 1999 (S.I. 1999 No. 2088)
 The Legal Advice and Assistance (Amendment) (No. 2) Regulations 1999 (S.I. 1999 No. 2089)
 The National Lottery etc. Act 1993 (Amendment of Section 23) (No. 2) Order 1999 (S.I. 1999 No. 2090)
 The Dual-Use and Related Goods (Export Control) (Amendment No. 3) Regulations 1999 (S.I. 1999 No. 2091)
 The Superannuation (Application of the Superannuation Act 1972, Section 1) (No.2) Order 1999 (S.I. 1999 No. 2092)
 The Telecommunications (Data Protection and Privacy) Regulations 1999 (S.I. 1999 No. 2093)
 The Banking (Gibraltar) Regulations 1999 (S.I. 1999 No. 2094)
 The Forgery and Counterfeiting (Protected Coins) Order 1999 (S.I. 1999 No. 2095)
 The Costs in Criminal Cases (General) (Amendment) Regulations 1999 (S.I. 1999 No. 2096)
 The Land Registration (No. 2) Rules 1999 (S.I. 1999 No. 2097)
 The Parliamentary Pensions (Amendment) Regulations 1999 (S.I. 1999 No. 2100)

2101-2200

 The European Parliamentary (United Kingdom Representatives) Pensions (Additional Voluntary Contributions Scheme) (Amendment) Order 1999 (S.I. 1999 No. 2101)
 The Education (Substituted Grammar Schools) Regulations 1999 (S.I. 1999 No. 2102)
 The Education (Proposals for Grammar Schools to cease to have Selective Admission Arrangements) Regulations 1999 (S.I. 1999 No. 2103)
 The Education (Annual Parents' Meetings) (England) Regulations 1999 (S.I. 1999 No. 2104)
 The Local Authorities (Contracting Out of Highway Functions) Order 1999 (S.I. 1999 No. 2106)
 The Postal Services Regulations 1999 (S.I. 1999 No. 2107)
 The Legal Officers (Annual Fees) Order 1999 (S.I. 1999 No. 2108)
 The Medicines (Aristolochia) (Emergency Prohibition) Order 1999 (S.I. 1999 No. 2109)
 The Ecclesiastical Judges, Legal Officers and Others (Fees) Order 1999 (S.I. 1999 No. 2110)
 The Care of Places of Worship Rules 1999 (S.I. 1999 No. 2111)
 The Church Representation Rules (Amendment) Resolution 1999 (S.I. 1999 No. 2112)
 The Parochial Fees Order 1999 (S.I. 1999 No. 2113)
 The Disability Discrimination (Description of Insurance Services) Regulations 1999 (S.I. 1999 No. 2114)
 The Public Processions (Northern Ireland) Act 1998 (Guidelines) Order 1999 (S.I. 1999 No. 2115)
 The Public Processions (Northern Ireland) Act 1998 (Code of Conduct) Order 1999 (S.I. 1999 No. 2116)
 The Public Processions (Northern Ireland) Act 1998 (Procedural Rules) Order 1999 (S.I. 1999 No. 2117)
 The Gifts for Relief in Poor Countries (Designation of Kosovo) Order 1999 (S.I. 1999 No. 2118)
 The Finance Act 1998, Section 83(1), (Appointed Day) Order 1999 (S.I. 1999 No. 2119 (C.55)])
 The Stansted Airport Aircraft Movement Limit (Amendment) Order 1999 (S.I. 1999 No. 2120)
 The Merchant Shipping (Reporting Requirements for Ships carrying Dangerous or Polluting Goods) (Amendment) Regulations 1999 (S.I. 1999 No. 2121)
 The A41 Trunk Road (No Man's Heath and Macefen Bypass and Detrunking) Order 1999 (S.I. 1999 No. 2122)
 The Legal Aid in Criminal and Care Proceedings (General) (Amendment) (No. 3) Regulations 1999 (S.I. 1999 No. 2123)
 The Legal Aid in Criminal and Care Proceedings (Costs) (Amendment) (No. 3) Regulations 1999 (S.I. 1999 No. 2124)
 The Public Airport Companies (Capital Finance) (Second Amendment) Order 1999 (S.I. 1999 No. 2125)
 The Plant Health (Amendment) (England) Order 1999 (S.I. 1999 No. 2126)
 The A205 Trunk Road (Hounslow) Red Route (Bus Priority) Traffic Order 1999 (S.I. 1999 No. 2127)
 The Contracting Out (Jury Summoning Functions) Order 1999 (S.I. 1999 No. 2128)
 The Welsh Highland Railway Order 1999 (S.I. 1999 No. 2129)
 The Nursery Education (England) (Amendment) (No. 2) Regulations 1999 (S.I. 1999 No. 2130)
 Northern Ireland Act Tribunal (Procedure) Rules 1999 (S.I. 1999 No. 2131)
 The New Forest (Confirmation of the Byelaws of the Verderers of the New Forest) Order 1999 (S.I. 1999 No. 2134)
 The Allocation of Housing and Homelessness (Amendment) (England) Regulations 1999 (S.I. 1999 No. 2135)
 The Deregulation (Casinos) Order 1999 (S.I. 1999 No. 2136)
 The Deregulation (Millennium Licensing) Order 1999 (S.I. 1999 No. 2137)
 The Appointment of Queen's Counsel Fees Order 1999 (S.I. 1999 No. 2138)
 The Motor Vehicles (Type Approval and Approval Marks) (Fees) Regulations 1999 (S.I. 1999 No. 2149)
 The Travel Documents (Refugees and Stateless Persons) (Fees) Regulations 1999 (S.I. 1999 No. 2150)
 The Income Tax (Employments) (Amendment No. 3) Regulations 1999 (S.I. 1999 No. 2155)
 The Finance Act 1995, Section 139(3), (Appointed Day) Order 1999 (S.I. 1999 No. 2156 (C. 52)])
 The Education (Governors' Annual Reports) (England) Regulations 1999 (S.I. 1999 No. 2157)
 The Education (School Performance Information) (England) (Amendment) Regulations 1999 (S.I. 1999 No. 2158)
 The Income Tax (Sub-contractors in the Construction Industry) (Amendment No. 2) Regulations 1999 (S.I. 1999 No. 2159)
 The Education (School Teachers' Pay and Conditions) (No. 2) Order 1999 (S.I. 1999 No. 2160)
 The Education (Bursaries for Teacher Training) (Revocation) (England) Regulations 1999 (S.I. 1999 No. 2162)
 The Education (School Government) (England) Regulations 1999 (S.I. 1999 No. 2163)
 The Education (Transfer of Functions Concerning School Lunches etc.) (England) (No. 2) Order 1999 (S.I. 1999 No. 2164)
 The Social Security Amendment (Sports Awards) Regulations 1999 (S.I. 1999 No. 2165)
 The Education (Teachers’ Qualifications and Health Standards) (England) Regulations 1999 (S.I. 1999 No. 2166)
 The Unfair Arbitration Agreements (Specified Amount) Order 1999 (S.I. 1999 No. 2167)
 The Education Maintenance Allowance (Pilot Areas) Regulations 1999 (S.I. 1999 No. 2168)
 The Local Government Act 1999 (Commencement No. 1) Order 1999 (S.I. 1999 No. 2169 (C. 53)])
 The Environmental Protection (Restriction on Use of Lead Shot) (England) Regulations 1999 (S.I. 1999 No. 2170)
 The Salford Royal Hospitals National Health Service Trust (Establishment) Amendment Order 1999 (S.I. 1999 No. 2176)
 The Health Act 1999 (Commencement No. 1) Order 1999 (S.I. 1999 No. 2177 (C.54)])
 The Education (National Curriculum) (Key Stage 1 Assessment Arrangements) (England) (Amendment) Order 1999 (S.I. 1999 No. 2187)
 The Education (National Curriculum) (Key Stage 2 Assessment Arrangements) (England) Order 1999 (S.I. 1999 No. 2188)
 The Education (National Curriculum) (Key Stage 3 Assessment Arrangements) (England) Order 1999 (S.I. 1999 No. 2189)
 The Cereal Seeds (Amendment) (England) Regulations 1999 (S.I. 1999 No. 2196)
 The Countryside Access (Amendment) (No. 2) Regulations 1999 (S.I. 1999 No. 2197)
 The Channel Tunnel Rail Link (Nomination) (London Underground Works) (Amendment) Order 1999 (S.I. 1999 No. 2198)
 The Motor Vehicles (Tests) (Amendment) Regulations 1999 (S.I. 1999 No. 2199)

2201-2300

 The Northern Ireland Act 1998 (Commencement No. 3) Order 1999 (S.I. 1999 No. 2204 (C.56)])
 The Merchant Shipping and Fishing Vessels (Personal Protective Equipment) Regulations 1999 (S.I. 1999 No. 2205)
 The Offshore Installations (Safety Zones) (No. 3) Order 1999 (S.I. 1999 No. 2206)
 The Dartford-Thurrock Crossing Tolls Order 1999 (S.I. 1999 No. 2207)
 The Dartford-Thurrock Crossing (Amendment) Regulations 1999 (S.I. 1999 No. 2208)
 The Magistrates' Courts Committees (South Yorkshire) Amalgamation Order 1999 (S.I. 1999 No. 2209)
 The Disability Rights Commission Act 1999 (Commencement No. 1 and Transitional Provision) Order 1999 (S.I. 1999 No. 2210 (C.57)])
 The Education (Induction Arrangements for School Teachers) (Amendment) (England) Regulations 1999 (S.I. 1999 No. 2211)
 The Education (Maintained Special Schools) (England) Regulations 1999 (S.I. 1999 No. 2212)
 The Education (School Organisation Proposals) (England) Regulations 1999 (S.I. 1999 No. 2213)
 The Education (National Curriculum) (Modern Foreign Languages) (Amendment) Order 1999 (S.I. 1999 No. 2214)
 The A205 Trunk Road (Lambeth) Red Route Traffic Order 1999 (S.I. 1999 No. 2217)
 The National Institute for Clinical Excellence (Amendment) Regulations 1999 (S.I. 1999 No. 2218)
 The National Institute for Clinical Excellence (Establishment and Constitution) Amendment Order 1999 (S.I. 1999 No. 2219)
 The Arnold and Carlton College, Nottingham (Dissolution) Order 1999 (S.I. 1999 No. 2220)
 The School Standards and Framework Act 1998 (Appointed Day) (England) Order 1999 (S.I. 1999 No. 2221)
 The Paying Agency (National Assembly for Wales) Regulations 1999 (S.I. 1999 No. 2223)
 The Films (Certification) (Amendment) Regulations 1999 (S.I. 1999 No. 2224)
 The Child Benefit (Northern Ireland Reciprocal Arrangements) Amendment Regulations 1999 (S.I. 1999 No. 2225)
 The Social Security (Incapacity Benefit and Jobseeker's Allowance) Amendment Regulations 1999 (S.I. 1999 No. 2226)
 The Social Security (Northern Ireland Reciprocal Arrangements) Amendment Regulations 1999 (S.I. 1999 No. 2227)
 The Environmental Impact Assessment (Forestry) (England and Wales) Regulations 1999 (S.I. 1999 No. 2228)
 The Health Service Medicines (Consent to Voluntary Scheme) Regulations 1999 (S.I. 1999 No. 2229)
 The Agricultural Holdings (Units of Production) (England) Order 1999 (S.I. 1999 No. 2230)
 The Environmentally Sensitive Areas (England) Designation Orders (Revocation of Specified Provisions) Regulations 1999 (S.I. 1999 No. 2231)
 The Environmentally Sensitive Areas (Essex Coast) Designation (Amendment) Order 1999 (S.I. 1999 No. 2232)
 The Environmentally Sensitive Areas (Blackdown Hills) Designation (Amendment) Order 1999 (S.I. 1999 No. 2233)
 The Environmentally Sensitive Areas (Cotswold Hills) Designation (Amendment) Order 1999 (S.I. 1999 No. 2234)
 The Environmentally Sensitive Areas (Shropshire Hills) Designation (Amendment) Order 1999 (S.I. 1999 No. 2235)
 The Environmentally Sensitive Areas (Dartmoor) Designation (Amendment) Order 1999 (S.I. 1999 No. 2236)
 The Environmentally Sensitive Areas (Upper Thames Tributaries) Designation (Amendment) Order 1999 (S.I. 1999 No. 2237)
 The Education (School Government) (Wales) Regulations 1999 (S.I. 1999 No. 2242 (W.2)])
 The Education (New Schools) (Wales) Regulations 1999 (S.I. 1999 No. 2243 (w.3)])
 The Railway Safety Regulations 1999 (S.I. 1999 No. 2244)
 The Licensing of Air Carriers Regulations 1999 (S.I. 1999 No. 2245)
 The Aeroplane Noise (Amendment) Regulations 1999 (S.I. 1999 No. 2253)
 The Land Registration Fees Order 1999 (S.I. 1999 No. 2254)
 The Education (School Sessions and Charges and Remissions Policies) (Information) (England) Regulations 1999 (S.I. 1999 No. 2255)
 The Education (Modification of Enactments Relating to Employment) Order 1999 (S.I. 1999 No. 2256)
 The Education (Non-Maintained Special Schools) (England) Regulations 1999 (S.I. 1999 No. 2257)
 The Education (School Meals Staff) (England) Regulations 1999 (S.I. 1999 No. 2258)
 The Education (Change of Category of Maintained Schools) (England) Regulations 1999 (S.I. 1999 No. 2259)
 The Education Act 1996 (Modification of Section 517) Regulations 1999 (S.I. 1999 No. 2260)
 The Education (School Teacher Appraisal) (Amendment) (England) Regulations 1999 (S.I. 1999 No. 2261)
 The Education (New Schools) (England) Regulations 1999 (S.I. 1999 No. 2262)
 The Education (Student Support) (Dance and Drama) Regulations 1999 (S.I. 1999 No. 2263)
 The Education (Grants) (Dance and Drama) (England) Regulations 1999 (S.I. 1999 No. 2264)
 The Education (Student Fees) (Exceptions) (England) Regulations 1999 (S.I. 1999 No. 2265)
 The Education (Student Support) (Amendment) Regulations 1999 (S.I. 1999 No. 2266)
 Education (Transition to New Framework) (Miscellaneous Provisions) Regulations 1999 (S.I. 1999 No. 2267)
 The Assured and Protected Tenancies (Lettings to Students) (Amendment) (No. 2) (England) Regulations 1999 (S.I. 1999 No. 2268)
 The Further Education Funding Council for England (Supplementary Functions) Order 1999 (S.I. 1999 No. 2269)
 The Education (Student Support) (European Institutions) Regulations 1999 (S.I. 1999 No. 2270)
 The Education (Schedule 32 to the School Standards and Framework Act 1998) (England) (No. 2) Regulations 1999 (S.I. 1999 No. 2271)
 The A1 Trunk Road (Ferrybridge To Selby Fork Junction) (Detrunking) Order 1999 (S.I. 1999 No. 2272)
 The A1 Motorway (Ferrybridge To Hook Moor Section And Connecting Roads) Scheme 1999 (S.I. 1999 No. 2273)
 The A1 Trunk Road (Spitalgap Lane to Trinity Farm) Order 1999 (S.I. 1999 No. 2274)
 The A63 Trunk Road (Selby Fork And Boot And Shoe Junctions) Order 1999 (S.I. 1999 No. 2275)
 The Civil Aviation (Route Charges for Navigation Services) (Fourth Amendment) Regulations 1999 (S.I. 1999 No. 2276)
 The Redundancy Payments (Continuity of Employment in Local Government, etc.) (Modification) Order 1999 (S.I. 1999 No. 2277)
 The South of Luton-Watford Gap-Dunchurch Special Road Scheme 1956 (Partial Revocation) Scheme 1999 (S.I. 1999 No. 2278)
 The M1 Motorway (Junction 15) Detrunking Order 1999 (S.I. 1999 No. 2279)
 The M1 Motorway (Junction 15) Connecting Roads Scheme 1999 (S.I. 1999 No. 2280)
 The Competition Act 1998 (Provisional Immunity from Penalties) Regulations 1999 (S.I. 1999 No. 2281)
 The Competition Act 1998 (Definition of Appropriate Person) Regulations 1999 (S.I. 1999 No. 2282)
 The Judicial Pensions (Qualifying Judicial Offices) (President of the Competition Commission Appeal Tribunals) Order 1999 (S.I. 1999 No. 2283)
 The Central Manchester Healthcare National Health Service Trust (Transfer of Trust Property) Order 1999 (S.I. 1999 No. 2298)

2301-2400

 The Wigan and Leigh Health Services National Health Service Trust (Establishment) Amendment Order 1999 (S.I. 1999 No. 2307)
 The Blackburn, Hyndburn and Ribble Valley Health Care National Health Service Trust (Establishment) Amendment Order 1999 (S.I. 1999 No. 2308)
 The Local Government (Discretionary Payments) (Amendment No. 2) Regulations 1999 (S.I. 1999 No. 2311)
 The Hamilton Oxford Schools Partnership Education Action Zone Order 1999 (S.I. 1999 No. 2312)
 The Greenwich—Time to Succeed Education Action Zone Order 1999 (S.I. 1999 No. 2313)
 The Education (Modification of Instruments Relating to Voluntary Schools) Regulations 1999 (S.I. 1999 No. 2314)
 The Relocation Grants (Form of Application) (Welsh Form of Application) Regulations 1999 (S.I. 1999 No. 2315)
 The Housing Renewal Grants (Prescribed Form and Particulars) (Welsh Form and Particulars) (Amendment) Regulations 1999 (S.I. 1999 No. 2316)
 The Companies (Contents of Annual Return) Regulations 1999 (S.I. 1999 No. 2322)
 The School Standards and Framework Act 1998 (Commencement No. 7 and Saving and Transitional Provisions) Order 1999 (S.I. 1999 No. 2323 (c. 59)])
 The Motor Vehicles (EC Type Approval) (Amendment No. 2) Regulations 1999 (S.I. 1999 No. 2324)
 The Feeding Stuffs (Enforcement) Regulations 1999 (S.I. 1999 No. 2325)
 The Food (Animals and Animal Products from Belgium) (Emergency Control) (England and Wales) (No. 2) Order 1999 (S.I. 1999 No. 2332)
 The Animal Feedingstuffs from Belgium (Control) (England and Wales) (No. 2) Regulations 1999 (S.I. 1999 No. 2333)
 The Films (Certification) (Amendment) (No. 2) Regulations 1999 (S.I. 1999 No. 2334)
 The Railtrack (Leeds Bridges) Order 1999 (S.I. 1999 No. 2336)
 The Primary Care Trusts (Consultation on Establishment, Dissolution and Transfer of Staff) Regulations 1999 (S.I. 1999 No. 2337)
 The Health Act 1999 (Commencement No. 2) Order 1999 (S.I. 1999 No. 2342 (C. 60)])
 The A205 Trunk Road (Lewisham) Red Route (Prohibited Turns) Traffic Order 1999 (S.I. 1999 No. 2343)
 The A3 Trunk Road (Wandsworth) Red Route Traffic Order 1999 (S.I. 1999 No. 2344)
 The A40 Trunk Road (Ealing and Hammersmith & Fulham) Red Route (Clearway) Experimental Traffic Order 1999 (S.I. 1999 No. 2345)
 The A4 Trunk Road (Hillingdon and Hounslow) Red Route Traffic Order 1997 Variation Order 1999 (S.I. 1999 No. 2346)
 The A205 Trunk Road (Lambeth) Red Route (Prohibition of Traffic) Traffic Order 1999 (S.I. 1999 No. 2348)
 The A40 Trunk Road (Ealing and Hammersmith & Fulham) Red Route Experimental Traffic Order 1999 (S.I. 1999 No. 2349)
 The Companies (Forms) (Amendment) Regulations 1999 (S.I. 1999 No. 2356)
 The Companies (Welsh Language Forms) (Amendment) Regulations 1999 (S.I. 1999 No. 2357)
 Rheoliadau (Diwygio) (Ffurflenni Cymraeg) CwmnÏau 1999 (S.I. 1999 Rhif 2357)
 The Social Security (Claims and Payments) Amendment Regulations 1999 (S.I. 1999 No. 2358)
 The M61 Motorway (Kearsley Spur) (Speed Limit) Regulations 1999 (S.I. 1999 No. 2359)
 The Distress for Rent (Amendment) Rules 1999 (S.I. 1999 No. 2360 (L. 17)])
 The Moorland (Livestock Extensification) (Amendment) Regulations 1999 (S.I. 1999 No. 2361)
 The University College London Hospitals National Health Service Trust (Establishment) Amendment Order 1999 (S.I. 1999 No. 2372)
 The Asbestos (Prohibitions) (Amendment) Regulations 1999 (S.I. 1999 No. 2373)
 The Keith and Dufftown Light Railway Order 1999 (S.I. 1999 No. 2382)
 The Stamp Duty Reserve Tax (UK Depositary Interests in Foreign Securities) Regulations 1999 (S.I. 1999 No. 2383)
 The Films (Modification of the Definition of British Film) Order 1999 (S.I. 1999 No. 2386)
 The Education (School Performance Information) (England) (Amendment) (No. 2) Regulations 1999 (S.I. 1999 No. 2387)
 The Motor Vehicles (Third Party Risks) (Amendment) Regulations 1999 (S.I. 1999 No. 2392)
 The Isle of Wight (Electoral Changes) Order 1999 (S.I. 1999 No. 2393)
 The Magistrates' Courts Committees (Constitution) Regulations 1999 (S.I. 1999 No. 2395)
 The Justices of the Peace (Size and Chairmanship of Bench) (Amendment) Rules 1999 (S.I. 1999 No. 2396)
 The Justices' Chief Executives and Justices' Clerks (Appointment) Regulations 1999 (S.I. 1999 No. 2397)
 The Gosport Borough Council (Forton Lake Opening Bridge) Order 1999 (S.I. 1999 No. 2400)

2401-2500

 The Housing Benefit (General) Amendment (No. 2) Regulations 1999 (S.I. 1999 No. 2401)
 The Transfer of Undertakings (Protection of Employment) (Amendment) Regulations 1999 (S.I. 1999 No. 2402)
 The Administration of the Rent Officer Service (England) Order 1999 (S.I. 1999 No. 2403)
 The Rail Vehicle Accessibility (South West Trains Class 458 Vehicles) Exemption Order 1999 (S.I. 1999 No. 2404)
 A1 Trunk Road (Barnet) Red Route (Speed Limit) Experimental Traffic Order 1999 Revocation Order 1999 (S.I. 1999 No. 2418)
 The Social Security Act 1998 (Commencement No. 9, and Savings and Consequential and Transitional Provisions) Order 1999 (S.I. 1999 No. 2422 (c. 61)])
 The Magistrates' Courts Committees (Greater Manchester) Amalgamation Order 1999 (S.I. 1999 No. 2426)
 The Goods Vehicle Operators (Qualifications)Regulations 1999 (S.I. 1999 No. 2430)
 The Public Service Vehicle Operators (Qualifications) Regulations 1999 (S.I. 1999 No. 2431)
 The Designation of Schools Having a Religious Character (England) Order 1999 (S.I. 1999 No. 2432)
 The Telecommunications (Licence Modification)(Standard Schedules) Regulations 1999 (S.I. 1999 No. 2450)
 The Telecommunications (Licence Modification) (Fixed Voice Telephony and International Facilities Operator Licences) Regulations 1999 (S.I. 1999 No. 2451)
 The Telecommunications (Licence Modification) (Mobile Public Telecommunication Operators) Regulations 1999 (S.I. 1999 No. 2452)
 The Telecommunications (Licence Modification) (British Telecommunications plc) Regulations 1999 (S.I. 1999 No. 2453)
 The Telecommunications (Licence Modification) (Cable and Local Delivery Operator Licences) Regulations 1999 (S.I. 1999 No. 2454)
 The Telecommunications (Licence Modification) (Kingston Communications (Hull) PLC) Regulations 1999 (S.I. 1999 No. 2455)
 The Education (Grammar School Designation) (Amendment) Order 1999 (S.I. 1999 No. 2456)
 The Spreadable Fats (Marketing Standards) (England) Regulations 1999 (S.I. 1999 No. 2457)
 The Civil Aviation (Canadian Navigation Services) (Second Amendment) Regulations 1999 (S.I. 1999 No. 2458)
 The Football Spectators (Designation of Enforcing Authority) Order 1999 (S.I. 1999 No. 2459)
 The Public Order (Domestic Football Banning) Order 1999 (S.I. 1999 No. 2460)
 The Football Spectators (Designation of Football Matches in England and Wales) Order 1999 (S.I. 1999 No. 2461)
 The Football (Offences) (Designation of Football Matches) Order 1999 (S.I. 1999 No. 2462)
 The Mines (Control of Ground Movement) Regulations 1999 (S.I. 1999 No. 2463)
 The Partnerships (Unrestricted Size) No. 13 Regulations 1999 (S.I. 1999 No. 2464)
 The Borough of Elmbridge (Electoral Changes) Order 1999 (S.I. 1999 No. 2465)
 The District of East Devon (Electoral Changes) Order 1999 (S.I. 1999 No. 2467)
 The City of Exeter (Electoral Changes) Order 1999 (S.I. 1999 No. 2468)
 The District of North Devon (Electoral Changes) Order 1999 (S.I. 1999 No. 2469)
 The District of Mid Devon (Electoral Changes) Order 1999 (S.I. 1999 No. 2470)
 The District of Teignbridge (Electoral Changes) Order 1999 (S.I. 1999 No. 2471)
 The District of Torridge (Electoral Changes) Order 1999 (S.I. 1999 No. 2472)
 The Borough of West Devon (Electoral Changes) Order 1999 (S.I. 1999 No. 2473)
 The Borough of Epsom and Ewell (Electoral Changes) Order 1999 (S.I. 1999 No. 2474)
 The Borough of Guildford (Electoral Changes) Order 1999 (S.I. 1999 No. 2475)
 The District of Mole Valley (Electoral Changes) Order 1999 (S.I. 1999 No. 2476)
 The Borough of Reigate and Banstead (Electoral Changes) Order 1999 (S.I. 1999 No. 2477)
 The Borough of Runnymede (Electoral Changes) Order 1999 (S.I. 1999 No. 2478)
 The Borough of Spelthorne (Electoral Changes) Order 1999 (S.I. 1999 No. 2479)
 The District of Tandridge (Electoral Changes) Order 1999 (S.I. 1999 No. 2480)
 The Borough of Surrey Heath (Electoral Changes) Order 1999 (S.I. 1999 No. 2481)
 The Borough of Waverley (Electoral Changes) Order 1999 (S.I. 1999 No. 2482)
 The Borough of Woking (Electoral Changes) Order 1999 (S.I. 1999 No. 2483)
 The School Standards and Framework Act 1998 (Amendment of Commencement Orders) (England) Order 1999 (S.I. 1999 No. 2484 (c. 62)])
 The Tax Credits Schemes (Miscellaneous Amendments) Regulations 1999 (S.I. 1999 No. 2487)
 The Tax Credits Schemes (Miscellaneous Amendments) (Northern Ireland) Regulations 1999 (S.I. 1999 No. 2488)
 The Gaming Duty (Amendment) Regulations 1999 (S.I. 1999 No. 2489)

2501-2600

 The District of Chester-le-Street (Electoral Changes) Order 1999 (S.I. 1999 No. 2503)
 The Court of Protection (Amendment) Rules 1999 (S.I. 1999 No. 2504)
 The Court of Protection (Enduring Powers of Attorney) (Amendment) Rules 1999 (S.I. 1999 No. 2505)
 The Education (Special Educational Needs) (Information) (England) Regulations 1999 (S.I. 1999 No. 2506)
 The National Health Service (Travelling Expenses and Remission of Charges) Amendment Regulations 1999 (S.I. 1999 No. 2507)
 The Alteration of Boundaries of the River Lugg Internal Drainage District Order 1999 (S.I. 1999 No. 2508)
 The Employment Relations Act 1999 (Commencement No. 1 and Transitional Provisions) Order 1999 (S.I. 1999 No. 2509 (c. 63)])
 The Medicines (Sale or Supply) (Miscellaneous Provisions) Amendment (No. 2) Regulations 1999 (S.I. 1999 No. 2510)
 The Transfer of Undertakings (Protection of Employment) (Rent Officer Service) Regulations 1999 (S.I. 1999 No. 2511)
 The Medicines (Products for Animal Use—Fees) (Amendment) Regulations 1999 (S.I. 1999 No. 2512)
 The Portsmouth Mile End Quay (Continental Ferry Port) Harbour Revision Order 1999 (S.I. 1999 No. 2513)
 The Medicines (Products Other Than Veterinary Drugs) (General Sale List) Amendment (No. 2) Order 1999 (S.I. 1999 No. 2535)
 The Stamp Duty Reserve Tax (Amendment) Regulations 1999 (S.I. 1999 No. 2536)
 The Stamp Duty (Collection and Recovery of Penalties) Regulations 1999 (S.I. 1999 No. 2537)
 The Taxes (Interest Rate) (Amendment No. 3) Regulations 1999 (S.I. 1999 No. 2538)
 The Stamp Duty (Exempt Instruments) (Amendment) Regulations 1999 (S.I. 1999 No. 2539)
 The Health Act 1999 (Commencement No. 3) Order 1999 (S.I. 1999 No. 2540 (C. 64)])
 The Health Act 1999 (Fund-holding Practices) (Transfer of Assets, Savings, Rights and Liabilities and Transitional Provisions) Order 1999 (S.I. 1999 No. 2541)
 The Magistrates' Courts Committees (Sussex) Amalgamation Order 1999 (S.I. 1999 No. 2542)
 The Occupational Pension Schemes (Preservation of Benefit) Amendment Regulations 1999 (S.I. 1999 No. 2543)
 The Bilston Community College (Dissolution) Order 1999 (S.I. 1999 No. 2544)
 The Education (School Inspection) (England) (Amendment) (No. 2) Regulations 1999 (S.I. 1999 No. 2545)
 The Competition Act 1998 (Application for Designation of Professional Rules) Regulations 1999 (S.I. 1999 No. 2546)
 The Rail Vehicle Accessibility (ScotRail Class 170/4 Vehicles) Exemption Order 1999 (S.I. 1999 No. 2547)
 The County Court Fees (Amendment) Order 1999 (S.I. 1999 No. 2548 (L. 18)])
 The Family Proceedings Fees (Amendment) Order 1999 (S.I. 1999 No. 2549 (L. 19)])
 The Electrical Equipment for Explosive Atmospheres (Certification) (Amendment) Regulations 1999 (S.I. 1999 No. 2550)
 Income Support (General) Amendment Regulations 1999 (S.I. 1999 No. 2554)
 The Social Security Amendment (Personal Allowances for Children and Young Persons) Regulations 1999 (S.I. 1999 No. 2555)
 The Social Security (Miscellaneous Amendments) (No. 2) Regulations 1999 (S.I. 1999 No. 2556)
 The Merger Reference (Universal Foods Corporation and Pointing Holdings Limited) (Interim Provision) Order 1999 (S.I. 1999 No. 2560)
 The Welfare Food (Amendment) Regulations 1999 (S.I. 1999 No. 2561)
 The National Health Service (Optical Charges and Payments) and (General Ophthalmic Services) (Amendment) Regulations 1999 (S.I. 1999 No. 2562)
 The National Health Service (Pharmaceutical Services) Amendment (No. 2) Regulations 1999 (S.I. 1999 No. 2563)
 The Distress for Rent (Amendment) (No. 2) Rules 1999 (S.I. 1999 No. 2564 (L.20)])
 The Civil Legal Aid (General) (Amendment) (No. 2) Regulations 1999 (S.I. 1999 No. 2565)
 The Social Security and Child Support (Tax Credits) Consequential Amendments Regulations 1999 (S.I. 1999 No. 2566)
 The Merchant Shipping (Accident Reporting and Investigation) Regulations 1999 (S.I. 1999 No. 2567)
 The Housing Renewal Grants (Amendment) (England) Regulations 1999 (S.I. 1999 No. 2568)
 The Supreme Court Fees (Amendment) Order 1999 (S.I. 1999 No. 2569 (L. 21)])
 The Tax Credits (Decisions and Appeals) (Amendment) Regulations 1999 (S.I. 1999 No. 2570)
 The Tax Credits (Payments on Account, Overpayments and Recovery) (Amendment) Regulations 1999 (S.I. 1999 No. 2571)
 The Tax Credits (Claims and Payments) (Amendment) Regulations 1999 (S.I. 1999 No. 2572)
 The Tax Credits (Payments on Account, Overpayments and Recovery) (Northern Ireland) (Amendment) Regulations 1999 (S.I. 1999 No. 2573)
 The Tax Credits (Claims and Payments) (Northern Ireland) (Amendment) Regulations 1999 (S.I. 1999 No. 2574)
 The Legal Advice and Assistance (Amendment) (No. 3) Regulations 1999 (S.I. 1999 No. 2575)
 The Legal Aid (Mediation in Family Matters) (Amendment) Regulations 1999 (S.I. 1999 No. 2576)
 The Legal Aid in Criminal and Care Proceedings (General) (Amendment) (No. 4) Regulations 1999 (S.I. 1999 No. 2577)
 The Education (Further Education Institutions Information) (England) (Amendment) Regulations 1999 (S.I. 1999 No. 2578)
 The City of Durham (Electoral Changes) Order 1999 (S.I. 1999 No. 2579)
 The District of Derwentside (Electoral Changes) Order 1999 (S.I. 1999 No. 2580)
 The District of Easington (Electoral Changes) Order 1999 (S.I. 1999 No. 2581)
 The Borough of Sedgefield (Electoral Changes) Order 1999 (S.I. 1999 No. 2582)
 The District of Teesdale (Electoral Changes) Order 1999 (S.I. 1999 No. 2583)
 The District of Wear Valley (Electoral Changes) Order 1999 (S.I. 1999 No. 2584)
 The Financial Services Act 1986 (Gas Industry Exemption) Order 1999 (S.I. 1999 No. 2586)
 The Pur Fleet (King's Lynn) Order 1999 (S.I. 1999 No. 2587)
 The Tax Credits (Decisions and Appeals) (Northern Ireland) (Amendment) Regulations 1999 (S.I. 1999 No. 2588)
 The Health and Safety (Fees) (Amendment) Regulations 1999 (S.I. 1999 No. 2597)

2601-2700

 The Export of Goods (Control) (Amendment No. 4) Order 1999 (S.I. 1999 No. 2609)
 Export of Goods (Licences for Exports to Indonesia) (Variation) Order 1999 (S.I. 1999 No. 2610)
 The Organic Farming (Wales) Regulations 1999 (S.I. 1999 No. 2611)
 The Housing Renewal Grants (Prescribed Form and Particulars) (Amendment) (England) Regulations 1999 (S.I. 1999 No. 2624)
 The Relocation Grants (Form of Application) (Amendment) (England) Regulations 1999 (S.I. 1999 No. 2625)
 The Export of Goods (Control) (Amendment No. 5) Order 1999 (S.I. 1999 No. 2627)
 The Broadcasting (Unlicensed Television Services) Exemption (Revocation) Order 1999 (S.I. 1999 No. 2628)
 The Rates and Precepts (Final Adjustments) (Amendment) (England) Order 1999 (S.I. 1999 No. 2629)
 The A406 North Circular Road (Barnet) (50 mph Speed Limit) Order 1999 (S.I. 1999 No. 2634)
 The A10 Trunk Road (Haringey) Red Route Experimental Traffic Order 1999 (S.I. 1999 No. 2635)
 The Friendly Societies (Modification of the Corporation Tax Acts) (Amendment) Regulations 1999 (S.I. 1999 No. 2636)
 The Taxes (Interest Rate) (Amendment No. 4) Regulations 1999 (S.I. 1999 No. 2637)
 The Disability Discrimination Code of Practice (Trade Organisations) Order 1999 (S.I. 1999 No. 2638)
 The Gas Act 1986 (Exemptions) Order 1999 (S.I. 1999 No. 2639)
 The Social Security Amendment (Notional Income and Capital) Regulations 1999 (S.I. 1999 No. 2640)
 The Plant Health (Amendment) (Wales) Order 1999 (S.I. 1999 No. 2641 (W.8))
 Gorchymyn Iechyd Planhigion (Diwygio) (Cymru) 1999 (S.I. 1999 No. 2641 (Cy.8))
 The Scunthorpe Community Health Care National Health Service Trust (Dissolution) Order 1999 (S.I. 1999 No. 2655)
 The Doncaster Healthcare National Health Service Trust Change of Name and (Establishment) Amendment Order 1999 (S.I. 1999 No. 2656)
 The Access to Justice Act 1999 (Commencement No. 1) Order 1999 (S.I. 1999 No. 2657 (C. 65)])
 The New School (Admissions) (England) Regulations 1999 (S.I. 1999 No. 2666)
 The East Yorkshire Hospitals and the Royal Hull Hospitals National Health Service Trusts (Dissolution) Order 1999 (S.I. 1999 No. 2674)
 The Hull and East Yorkshire Hospitals National Health Service Trust (Establishment) Order 1999 (S.I. 1999 No. 2675)
 The Social Security and Child Support (Decisions and Appeals), Vaccine Damage Payments and Jobseeker's Allowance (Amendment) Regulations 1999 (S.I. 1999 No. 2677)
 The Companies (Forms) (Amendment) (No. 2) Regulations 1999 (S.I. 1999 No. 2678)
 The Companies (Welsh Language Forms) (Amendment) (No. 2) Regulations 1999 (S.I. 1999 No. 2679)
 The East Yorkshire Community Healthcare and the Hull and Holderness Community Health National Health Service Trusts (Dissolution) Order 1999 (S.I. 1999 No. 2687)
 The Hull and East Riding Community Health National Health Service Trust (Establishment) Order 1999 (S.I. 1999 No. 2688)
 The Access to Justice Act 1999 (Transitional Provisions and Savings) Order 1999 (S.I. 1999 No. 2689)
 The Borough of Amber Valley (Electoral Changes) Order 1999 (S.I. 1999 No. 2690)
 The District of Bolsover (Electoral Changes) Order 1999 (S.I. 1999 No. 2691)
 The Borough of Chesterfield (Electoral Changes) Order 1999 (S.I. 1999 No. 2692)
 The District of Derbyshire Dales (Electoral Changes) Order 1999 (S.I. 1999 No. 2693)
 The Borough of Erewash (Electoral Changes) Order 1999 (S.I. 1999 No. 2694)
 The Borough of High Peak (Electoral Changes) Order 1999 (S.I. 1999 No. 2695)
 The District of North East Derbyshire (Electoral Changes) Order 1999 (S.I. 1999 No. 2696)
 The District of South Derbyshire (Electoral Changes) Order 1999 (S.I. 1999 No. 2697)
 The Seeds (Fees) (Amendment) (England) Regulations 1999 (S.I. 1999 No. 2698)
 The A1 Trunk Road (Haringey) Red Route (Prohibited Turn) Experimental Traffic Order 1999 (S.I. 1999 No. 2700)

2701-2800

 The A205 Trunk Road (Lewisham) Red Route (Prohibited Turns) (No. 3) Traffic Order 1999 (S.I. 1999 No. 2701)
 The National Health Service (General Ophthalmic Services) (Amendment) Regulations 1999 (S.I. 1999 No. 2714)
 The Neath to Abergavenny Trunk Road (A465) (Abergavenny to Hirwaun Dualling and Slip Roads) and East of Abercynon to East of Dowlais Road (A4060), Cardiff to Glan Conwy Trunk Road (A470) (Connecting Roads) Order 1999  (S.I. 1999 No.2720 (W.9)])
 Gorchymyn Cefnffordd Castell-Nedd — Y Fenni (A465) (Deuoli o'r Fenni i Hirwaun a'r Ffyrdd Ymuno ac Ymadael) a Ffordd Man i'r Dwyrain o Abercynon — Man i'r Dwyrain o Ddowlais (A4060), Cefnffordd Caerdydd — Glanconwy (A470) (Ffyrdd Cysylltu) 1999 (([http://www.legislation.gov.uk/wsi/1999/2720/contents/made/welsh S.I. 1999 Rhif 2720 (Cy.9))
 The Merchant Shipping (Life-Saving Appliances For Ships Other Than Ships Of Classes III To VI(A)) Regulations 1999 (S.I. 1999 No. 2721)
 The Merchant Shipping (Musters, Training and Decision Support Systems) Regulations 1999 (S.I. 1999 No. 2722)
 The Merchant Shipping (Life-Saving Appliances For Passenger Ships Of Classes III To VI(A)) Regulations 1999 (S.I. 1999 No. 2723)
 The M60 Motorway (Improvement Between Junctions 5 and 8) Connecting Roads Scheme 1999 (S.I. 1999 No. 2724)
 The Consumer Credit (Content of Quotations) and Consumer Credit (Advertisements) (Amendment) Regulations 1999 (S.I. 1999 No. 2725)
 The Plant Health (Amendment) (England) (No. 2) Order 1999 (S.I. 1999 No. 2726)
 The Changing of School Session Times (England) Regulations 1999 (S.I. 1999 No. 2733)
 The Housing Benefit (General) Amendment (No. 3) Regulations 1999 (S.I. 1999 No. 2734)
 The Organic Farming (Amendment) Regulations 1999 (S.I. 1999 No. 2735)
 The Social Security (Contributions) (Amendment No. 5) Regulations 1999 (S.I. 1999 No. 2736)
 The Legal Aid in Criminal and Care Proceedings (General) (Amendment) (No. 5) Regulations 1999 (S.I. 1999 No. 2737)
 The Legal Aid (Mediation in Family Matters) (Amendment) (No. 2) Regulations 1999 (S.I. 1999 No. 2738)
 The Social Security Act 1998 (Commencement No. 10 and Transitional Provisions) Order 1999 (S.I. 1999 No. 2739 (C.67)])
 The Prosecution of Offences (Youth Courts Time Limits) Regulations 1999 (S.I. 1999 No. 2743)
 The Prosecution of Offences (Custody Time Limits) (Amendment) Regulations 1999 (S.I. 1999 No. 2744)
 The A1 Trunk Road (Islington) Red Route Traffic Order 1993 Variation (No. 3) Order 1999 (S.I. 1999 No. 2745)
 The Army Terms of Service (Amendment) (No. 2) Regulations 1999 (S.I. 1999 No. 2764)
 The Magistrates' Courts (Miscellaneous Amendments) Rules 1999 (S.I. 1999 No. 2765)
 The Home Repair Assistance (Extension) (England) Regulations 1999 (S.I. 1999 No. 2766)
 The Funding Agency for Schools Dissolution Order 1999 (S.I. 1999 No. 2767)
 The Children (Protection from Offenders) (Amendment) Regulations 1999 (S.I. 1999 No. 2768)
 The Finance Act 1999, section 20, (Appointed Day) Order 1999 (S.I. 1999 No. 2769 (C. 68)])
 The Companies (Investment Companies) (Distribution of Profits) Regulations 1999 (S.I. 1999 No. 2770)
 The National Savings Stock Register (Amendment) Regulations 1999 (S.I. 1999 No. 2771)
 The Social Fund Cold Weather Payments (General) Amendment Regulations 1999 (S.I. 1999 No. 2781)
 The Borough of Sefton (Electoral Changes) Order 1999 (S.I. 1999 No. 2782)
 The Justices' Clerks Rules 1999 (S.I. 1999 No. 2784 (L. 22)])
 The Transfer of Functions (Scientific Research) Order 1999 (S.I. 1999 No. 2785)
 The Transfer of Functions (Nuclear Installations) Order 1999 (S.I. 1999 No. 2786)
 The National Assembly for Wales (Transfer of Functions) (No.2) Order 1999 (S.I. 1999 No. 2787)
 The European Communities (Designation) (No. 3)Order 1999 (S.I. 1999 No. 2788)
 The Criminal Evidence (Northern Ireland) Order 1999 (S.I. 1999 No. 2789 (N.I. 8)])
 The Employment Relations (Northern Ireland) Order 1999 (S.I. 1999 No. 2790 (N.I. 9)])
 The Health Act 1999 (Commencement No. 5) Order 1999 (S.I. 1999 No. 2793 (C. 69)])
 The National Health Service (Penalty Charge) Regulations 1999 (S.I. 1999 No. 2794)
 The Health Act 1999 (Supplementary and Consequential Provisions) Order 1999 (S.I. 1999 No. 2795)
 The Food (Animals and Animal Products from Belgium) (Emergency Control) (England and Wales) (No. 3) Order 1999 (S.I. 1999 No. 2798)
 The Animal Feedingstuffs from Belgium (Control) (England and Wales) (No. 3) Regulations 1999 (S.I. 1999 No. 2799)
 The New Schools (Admissions) (Wales) Regulations 1999 (S.I. 1999 No. 2800 (W. 14))
 Rheoliadau Ysgolion Newydd (Derbyniadau) (Cymru) 1999 (S.I. 1999 Rhif 2800 (Cy. 14))

2801-2900

 The Commission for Health Improvement (Membership and Procedure) Regulations 1999 (S.I. 1999 No. 2801)
 The Education (School Meals Staff) (Wales) Regulations 1999 (S.I. 1999 No. 2802 (W.15))
 Rheoliadau Addysg (Staff Prydau Bwyd Ysgolion) (Cymru) 1999 (S.I. 1999 Rhif 2802 (Cy.15))
 The A3 Trunk Road (Kingston upon Thames) Red Route Traffic Order 1996 Variation Order 1999 (S.I. 1999 No. 2803)
 The A12 Trunk Road (Redbridge, Waltham Forest, Hackney and Tower Hamlets) Red Route (Clearway) Traffic Order 1999 (S.I. 1999 No. 2804)
 The A12 Trunk Road (Redbridge) Red Route Traffic Order 1999 (S.I. 1999 No. 2805)
 The A1 Trunk Road (Haringey) Red Route Traffic Order 1993 Variation (No. 2) Order 1999 (S.I. 1999 No. 2806)
 The A3 Trunk Road (Kingston upon Thames) Red Route (Clearway) Traffic Order 1996 Variation Order 1999 (S.I. 1999 No. 2807)
 The Justices' Clerks (Qualifications of Assistants) (Amendment) Rules 1999 (S.I. 1999 No. 2814 (L.23)])
 The Local Government Act 1999 (Commencement) (Wales) Order 1999 (S.I. 1999 No. 2815 (C.70) (W.16))
 Gorchymyn Deddf Llywodraeth Leol 1999 (Cymru) (Cychwyn) 1999 (S.I. 1999 Rhif 2815 (C.70) (Cy.16))
 The Education (Mathematics and Science Teacher Training Incentive) (Wales) Regulations 1999 (S.I. 1999 No. 2816 (W.17))
 Rheoliadau Addysg (Cymhelliant Hyfforddi Athrawon Mathemateg a Gwyddoniaeth) (Cymru) 1999 (S.I. 1999 Rhif 2816 (Cy.17))
 The Education (Teachers' Qualifications and Health Standards) (Wales) Regulations 1999 (S.I. 1999 No. 2817 (W.18))
 Rheoliadau Addysg (Cymwysterau a Safonau Iechyd Athrawon) (Cymru) 1999 (S.I. 1999 Rhif 2817 (Cy.18))
 The Federal Republic of Yugoslavia (Supply, Sale and Export of Petroleum and Petroleum Products) (Penalties and Licences) (No. 3) Regulations 1999 (S.I. 1999 No. 2821)
 The Indonesia (Supply, Sale, Export and Shipment of Equipment) (Penalties and Licences) Regulations 1999 (S.I. 1999 No. 2822)
 The Employment Relations Act 1999 (Commencement No. 2 and Transitional and Saving Provisions) Order 1999 (S.I. 1999 No. 2830 (C. 72)])
 The Value Added Tax (Special Provisions) (Amendment) Order 1999 (S.I. 1999 No. 2831)
 The Value Added Tax (Cars) (Amendment) Order 1999 (S.I. 1999 No. 2832)
 The Value Added Tax (Supplies of Goods where Input Tax cannot be recovered) Order 1999 (S.I. 1999 No. 2833)
 The Value Added Tax (Subscriptions to Trade Unions, Professional and Other Public Interest Bodies) Order 1999 (S.I. 1999 No. 2834)
 The Crown Court (Amendment) Rules 1999 (S.I. 1999 No. 2838 (L.24)])
 The Insurance Companies (Overseas Life Assurance Business) (Compliance) (Amendment) Regulations 1999 (S.I. 1999 No. 2839)
 The National Health Service (Travelling Expenses and Remission of Charges) Amendment (Wales) Regulations 1999 (S.I. 1999 No. 2840 (W.20))
 Rheoliadau'r Gwasanaeth Iechyd Gwladol (Costau Teithio a Dileu Taliadau) (Diwygio) (Cymru) 1999 (S.I. 1999 Rhif 2840 (Cy.20))
 The National Health Service (Optical Charges and Payments) and (General Ophthalmic Services) Amendment (Wales) Regulations 1999 (S.I. 1999 No. 2841 (W.21))
 Rheoliadau'r Gwasanaeth Iechyd Gwladol (Ffioedd a Thaliadau Optegol) a (Gwasanaethau Offthalmig Cyffredinol) Diwygio (Cymru) 1999 (S.I. 1999 Rhif 2841 (Cy.21))
 The Major Precepting Authorities (Excessive Budget Requirements—Payments) (England) Regulations 1999 (S.I. 1999 No. 2842)
 The Veterinary Surgeons and Veterinary Practitioners (Registration) Regulations Order of Council 1999 (S.I. 1999 No. 2846)
 The Competition Act 1998 (Commencement No. 4) Order 1999 (S.I. 1999 No. 2859 (C.74)])
 The Social Security Act 1998 (Commencement No. 11, and Savings and Consequential and Transitional Provisions) Order 1999 (S.I. 1999 No. 2860 (C.75)])
 The Education (Student Fees) (Exceptions) (Wales) Regulations 1999 (S.I. 1999 No. 2862 (W. 22))
 Rheoliadau Addysg (Ffioedd Myfyrwyr) (Eithriadau) (Cymru) 1999 (S.I. 1999 Rhif 2862 (Cy. 22))
 The Postal Privilege (Suspension) Order 1999 (Revocation) Order 1999 (S.I. 1999 No. 2863)
 The Motor Vehicles (Driving Licences) Regulations 1999 (S.I. 1999 No. 2864)
 The Public Telecommunication System Designation (GC Pan European Crossing UK Limited) Order 1999 (S.I. 1999 No. 2865)
 The Public Telecommunication System Designation (Farland Services UK Limited) Order 1999 (S.I. 1999 No. 2866)
 The Public Telecommunication System Designation (MTU Inform Europe Limited) Order 1999 (S.I. 1999 No. 2867)
 The Public Telecommunication System Designation (Kingston Communications (Hull) PLC) Order 1999 (S.I. 1999 No. 2868)
 The Public Telecommunication System Designation (Tele2 Communications Services Limited) Order 1999 (S.I. 1999 No. 2869)
 The Public Telecommunication System Designation (USA Global Link (UK) Limited) Order 1999 (S.I. 1999 No. 2870)
 The Public Telecommunication System Designation (ICO Services Limited) Order 1999 (S.I. 1999 No. 2871)
 The Public Telecommunication System Designation (Carrier One Ltd) Order 1999 (S.I. 1999 No. 2872)
 The Public Telecommunication System Designation (Swisscom (UK) Limited) Order 1999 (S.I. 1999 No. 2873)
 The Public Telecommunication System Designation (Telia UK Ltd) Order 1999 (S.I. 1999 No. 2874)
 The Public Telecommunication System Designation (PLDncompass Limited) Order 1999 (S.I. 1999 No. 2875)
 The Public Telecommunication System Designation (IFC Global (UK) Ltd) Order 1999 (S.I. 1999 No. 2876)
 The Prevention of Terrorism (Temporary Provisions) Act 1989 (Designated Ports) Order 1999 (S.I. 1999 No. 2877)
 The Education (Islamia Primary School, Brent) (Exemption from Pay and Conditions) Order 1999 (S.I. 1999 No. 2879)
 The Carriage by Air (Sterling Equivalents) Order 1999 (S.I. 1999 No. 2881)
 The Education (School Teacher Appraisal) (Wales) Regulations 1999 (S.I. 1999 No. 2888 (W. 25))
 Rheoliadau Addysg (Gwerthuso Athrawon Ysgol) (Cymru) 1999 (S.I. 1999 Rhif 2888 (Cy. 25))
 The Medicines (Aristolochia) (Temporary Prohibition) Order 1999 (S.I. 1999 No. 2889)
 The Local Government Residuary Body (England) (Winding Up) Order 1999 (S.I. 1999 No. 2890)
 Nuclear Reactors (Environmental Impact Assessment for Decommissioning) Regulations 1999 (S.I. 1999 No. 2892)
 The Education (School Admission Appeals: The National Assembly for Wales Code of Practice) (Appointed Day) Order 1999 (S.I. 1999 No. 2893 (W.26))
 Gorchymyn Addysg (Apelau Derbyniadau Ysgol: Cod Ymarfer Cynulliad Cenedlaethol Cymru) (Diwrnod Penodedig) 1999 (S.I. 1999 Rhif 2893 (Cy.26))
 The General Optical Council (Testing of Sight by Persons Training as Ophthalmic Opticians Rules) (Amendment) Order of Council 1999 (S.I. 1999 No. 2897)

2901-3000

 The Legal Services Ombudsman (Jurisdiction) (Amendment) Order 1999 (S.I. 1999 No. 2905)
 The Community Health Councils (Amendment) Regulations 1999 (S.I. 1999 No. 2906)
 The Treasury Bills (Amendment) Regulations 1999 (S.I. 1999 No. 2907)
 The Finance Act 1998, Section 159 (Appointed Day) and Schedule 26 (Commencement Etc.) Order 1999 (S.I. 1999 No. 2908 (C. 76)])
 The Cornwall Healthcare National Health Service Trust (Transfer of Trust Property) Order 1999 (S.I. 1999 No. 2909)
 The Bath and West Community National Health Service Trust (Transfer of Trust Property) Order 1999 (S.I. 1999 No. 2918)
 The Housing (Right to Buy) (Priority of Charges) (England) Order 1999 (S.I. 1999 No. 2919)
 The Motor Cycles Etc. (EC Type Approval) Regulations 1999 (S.I. 1999 No. 2920)
 The University Hospitals of Leicester National Health Service Trust (Establishment) Order 1999 (S.I. 1999 No. 2921)
 The District of Kennet (Electoral Changes) Order 1999 (S.I. 1999 No. 2922)
 The District of North Wiltshire (Electoral Changes) Order 1999 (S.I. 1999 No. 2923)
 The District of Salisbury (Electoral Changes) Order 1999 (S.I. 1999 No. 2924)
 The Excise Duty (Amendment of the Isle of Man Act 1979) Order 1999 (S.I. 1999 No. 2925)
 The District of West Wiltshire (Electoral Changes) Order 1999 (S.I. 1999 No. 2926)
 The Borough of Swindon (Electoral Changes) Order 1999 (S.I. 1999 No. 2927)
 The Value Added Tax (Input Tax) (Amendment) Order 1999 (S.I. 1999 No. 2930)
 The Rail Vehicle Accessibility (Serco Metrolink T68A Vehicles) Exemption Order 1999 (S.I. 1999 No. 2932)
 The Organic Farming (Amendment) (No. 2) Regulations 1999 (S.I. 1999 No. 2933)
 The Wireless Telegraphy (Cordless Telephone Apparatus) (Restriction and Marking) Order 1999 (S.I. 1999 No. 2934)
 The Local Authorities (Calculation of Council Tax Base) (Wales) (Amendment) Regulations 1999 (S.I. 1999 No. 2935 (W.27))
 Rheoliadau Awdurdodau Lleol (Cyfrifo Sylfaen Treth Gyngor) (Cymru) (Diwygio) 1999 (S.I. 1999 Rhif 2935 (Cy.27))
 The Northern Ireland Act 1998 (Commencement No. 4) Order 1999 (S.I. 1999 No. 2936 (C. 78)])
 The Education (Amendment of School and Pupil Information Regulations) (England) Regulations 1999 (S.I. 1999 No. 2937)
 The Public Telecommunication System Designation (Core Telecommunications Limited) Order 1999 (S.I. 1999 No. 2938)
 The Public Telecommunication System Designation (WinStar Communications Limited) Order 1999 (S.I. 1999 No. 2939)
 The Public Telecommunication System Designation (TNI (Telecom) Limited) Order 1999 (S.I. 1999 No. 2940)
 The Public Telecommunication System Designation (IBSC Limited) Order 1999 (S.I. 1999 No. 2941)
 The Public Telecommunication System Designation (Tele2 Sweden Limited) Order 1999 (S.I. 1999 No. 2942)
 The Public Telecommunication System Designation (Faultbasic Limited) Order 1999 (S.I. 1999 No. 2943)
 The Public Telecommunication System Designation (GTS Business Services (UK) Limited) Order 1999 (S.I. 1999 No. 2944)
 The Public Telecommunication System Designation (WXNET Limited) Order 1999 (S.I. 1999 No. 2945)
 The Public Telecommunication System Designation (Enitel ASA) Order 1999 (S.I. 1999 No. 2946)
 The Public Telecommunication System Designation (G.C. Global Communications Limited) Order 1999 (S.I. 1999 No. 2947)
 The Public Telecommunication System Designation (Level 3 Communications Limited) Order 1999 (S.I. 1999 No. 2948)
 The Public Telecommunication System Designation (Pantheon Telecom (UK) Limited) Order 1999 (S.I. 1999 No. 2949)
 The Public Telecommunication System Designation (BSI ACCESS UK Limited) Order 1999 (S.I. 1999 No. 2950)
 The Public Telecommunication System Designation (StarGlobal Ltd) Order 1999 (S.I. 1999 No. 2951)
 The Public Telecommunication System Designation (Telecom New Zealand (UK) Licences Limited) Order 1999 (S.I. 1999 No. 2952)
 The Public Telecommunication System Designation (CompleTel UK Limited) Order 1999 (S.I. 1999 No. 2953)
 The Public Telecommunication System Designation (Teleport UK Limited (trading as Satellite Media Services)) Order 1999 (S.I. 1999 No. 2954)
 The Northern Birmingham Mental Health National Health Service Trust (Establishment) Amendment Order 1999 (S.I. 1999 No. 2955)
 The Corporation Tax (Simplified Arrangements for Group Relief) Regulations 1999 (S.I. 1999 No. 2975)
 The Crime and Disorder Act 1998 (Commencement No. 5) Order 1999 (S.I. 1999 No. 2976 (C. 79)])
 The Asbestos (Prohibitions) (Amendment) (No. 2) Regulations 1999 (S.I. 1999 No. 2977)
 The Road Vehicles (Brake Linings Safety) Regulations 1999 (S.I. 1999 No. 2978)
 The Financial Markets and Insolvency (Settlement Finality) Regulations 1999 (S.I. 1999 No. 2979)
 The Devon (Coroners' Districts) Order 1999 (S.I. 1999 No. 2980)
 The River Thames (Hungerford Footbridges) Order 1999 (S.I. 1999 No. 2981)
 The Fishing Vessels (EC Directive on Harmonised Safety Regime) Regulations 1999 (S.I. 1999 No. 2998)
 The Financial Services Act 1986 (Restriction of Exemption) Order 1999 (S.I. 1999 No. 2999)
 The Insurance Brokers (Registration) Act 1977 (Amendment) Order 1999 (S.I. 1999 No. 3000)

3001-3100

 The A406 Trunk Road (Hanger Lane, Ealing) (Prohibition of U-Turn) Order 1999 (S.I. 1999 No. 3002)
 The Magistrates' Courts Committee Areas Order 1999 (S.I. 1999 No. 3008)
 The Petty Sessions Areas Order 1999 (S.I. 1999 No. 3009)
 The Justices of the Peace (Commission Areas) Order 1999 (S.I. 1999 No. 3010)
 The Road Traffic (NHS Charges) (Appeals: Ending of Transitional Period) Order 1999 (S.I. 1999 No. 3012)
 The Wednesbury Education Action Zone Order 1999 (S.I. 1999 No. 3013)
 The Wythenshawe Education Action Zone Order 1999 (S.I. 1999 No. 3014)
 The East Manchester Education Action Zone Order 1999 (S.I. 1999 No. 3015)
 The Dudley Partnership for Achievement Education Action Zone Order 1999 (S.I. 1999 No. 3016)
 The Telford and Wrekin Education Action Zone Order 1999 (S.I. 1999 No. 3017)
 The Heart of Slough Education Action Zone Order 1999 (S.I. 1999 No. 3018)
 The Southend Education Action Zone Order 1999 (S.I. 1999 No. 3019)
 The Hastings and St Leonards Education Action Zone Order 1999 (S.I. 1999 No. 3020)
 The Preston Education Action Zone Order 1999 (S.I. 1999 No. 3021)
 The North East Derbyshire Coalfields Education Action Zone Order 1999 (S.I. 1999 No. 3022)
 The New Horizons Kent–Somerset Virtual Education Action Zone Order 1999 (S.I. 1999 No. 3023)
 The Widening Horizons—North Islington Education Action Zone Order 1999 (S.I. 1999 No. 3024)
 The Hackney Education Action Zone Order 1999 (S.I. 1999 No. 3025)
 The Gas Act 1986 (Exemptions) (No. 4) (Amendment) Order 1999 (S.I. 1999 No. 3026)
 The Competition Act 1998 (Commission Investigation and Director's Investigation) Order 1999 (S.I. 1999 No. 3027)
 The Housing (Right to Acquire) (Discount) (Amendment) Order 1999 (S.I. 1999 No. 3028)
 The Value Added Tax Regulations 1999 (S.I. 1999 No. 3029)
 The Insurance Brokers Registration Council Election Scheme Approval Order 1999 (S.I. 1999 No. 3030)
 The Building Societies (Members' Requisitions) Order 1999 (S.I. 1999 No. 3031)
 The Building Societies (Nominations for Directors' Election) Order 1999 (S.I. 1999 No. 3032)
 The Building Societies (Members' Resolutions) Order 1999 (S.I. 1999 No. 3033)
 The Glenfield Hospital, the Leicester General Hospital and the Leicester Royal Infirmary National Health Service Trusts (Dissolution) Order 1999 (S.I. 1999 No. 3036)
 The Income Tax (Indexation) (No. 2) Order 1999 (S.I. 1999 No. 3038)
 The Magistrates' Courts (Forms) (Amendment No. 2) Rules 1999 (S.I. 1999 No. 3039 (L. 25)])
 The Crown Court (Forms Amendment) Rules 1999 (S.I. 1999 No. 3040 (L.26)])
 The Price Marking Order 1999 (S.I. 1999 No. 3042)
 The Portland Harbour Fishery (Variation) Order 1999 (S.I. 1999 No. 3049)
 The Avalon, Somerset, National Health Service Trust (Change of Name) Order 1999 (S.I. 1999 No. 3050)
 The A13 Trunk Road (Tower Hamlets) Red Route (Bus Priority) Traffic Order 1999 (S.I. 1999 No. 3051)
 The Conservation of Seals (England) Order 1999 (S.I. 1999 No. 3052)
 The Asylum Support (Interim Provisions) Regulations 1999 (S.I. 1999 No. 3056)
 The Housing Accommodation (Persons subject to Immigration Control) (Amendment) (England) Order 1999 (S.I. 1999 No. 3057)
 The Occupational Pension Schemes (Contracting-out) (Amount Required for Restoring State Scheme Rights) Amendment Regulations 1999 (S.I. 1999 No. 3069)
 The Water and Sewerage Undertakers (Pipelaying and Other Works) (Code of Practice) Order 1999 (S.I. 1999 No. 3070)
 The General Chiropractic Council (Professional Indemnity Insurance) Rules Order 1999 (S.I. 1999 No. 3071)
 The Jobseeker's Allowance Amendment (New Deal) Regulations 1999 (S.I. 1999 No. 3083)
 The Home Repair Assistance (Extension) (Wales) Regulations 1999 (S.I. 1999 No. 3084 (W.35))
 Rheoliadau Cymorth Trwsio Cartref (Estyn)(Cymru) 1999 (S.I. 1999 Rhif 3084 (Cy.35))
 The Financial Services Act 1986 (Exemption) Order 1999 (S.I. 1999 No. 3085)
 The Immigration (Transit Visa) (Amendment) Order 1999 (S.I. 1999 No. 3086)
 The Jobseeker's Allowance (Amendment) (No. 2) Regulations 1999 (S.I. 1999 No. 3087)
 The Water Appointment (Competition Commission) Regulations 1999 (S.I. 1999 No. 3088)
 The Gas Act 1986 (Exemptions) (No. 2) Order 1999 (S.I. 1999 No. 3089)
 The Crime (Sentences) Act 1997 (Commencement No. 3) Order 1999 (S.I. 1999 No. 3096 (C. 80)])
 The A13 Trunk Road (A112 Prince Regent Lane Junction Improvement, Trunk Road and Slip Roads) Order 1999 (S.I. 1999 No. 3097)
 The Legal Aid in Civil Proceedings (Remuneration) (Amendment) Regulations 1999 (S.I. 1999 No. 3098)
 The Greater London Magistrates' Courts Authority (Constitution) Regulations 1999 (S.I. 1999 No. 3099)

3101-3200

 The A3 Trunk Road (Wandsworth) Red Route Experimental Traffic Order 1999 (S.I. 1999 No. 3103)
 The Good Laboratory Practice Regulations 1999 (S.I. 1999 No. 3106)
 The Motor Fuel (Composition and Content) Regulations 1999 (S.I. 1999 No. 3107)
 The Social Security (Claims and Information) Regulations 1999 (S.I. 1999 No. 3108)
 The Social Security (Incapacity for Work) Miscellaneous Amendments Regulations 1999 (S.I. 1999 No. 3109)
 The Tax Credit (New Category of Child Care Provider) Regulations 1999 (S.I. 1999 No. 3110)
 The Docklands Light Railway (Miscellaneous Closure Exemptions) Order 1999 (S.I. 1999 No. 3111)
 The Docklands Light Railway (Lewisham Extension) (Exemptions) Order 1999 (S.I. 1999 No. 3112)
 The Railways (Alternative Closure Procedure) (Amendment) Order 1999 (S.I. 1999 No. 3113)
 The Value Added Tax (Amendment) (No. 4) Regulations 1999 (S.I. 1999 No. 3114)
 The Value Added Tax (Importation of Investment Gold) Relief Order 1999 (S.I. 1999 No. 3115)
 The Value Added Tax (Investment Gold) Order 1999 (S.I. 1999 No. 3116)
 The Value Added Tax (Terminal Markets) Order 1999 (S.I. 1999 No. 3117)
 The Value Added Tax (Input Tax) (Amendment) (No. 2) Order 1999 (S.I. 1999 No. 3118)
 The Value Added Tax (Treatment of Transactions) (Amendment) Order 1999 (S.I. 1999 No. 3119)
 The Value Added Tax (Special Provisions) (Amendment) (No. 2) Order 1999 (S.I. 1999 No. 3120)
 The Value Added Tax (Input Tax) (Specified Supplies) Order 1999 (S.I. 1999 No. 3121)
 The Free Zone (Liverpool) Designation (Variation) Order 1999 (S.I. 1999 No. 3122)
 The Local Authorities (Calculation of Council Tax Base) (Amendment) (England) Regulations 1999 (S.I. 1999 No. 3123)
 The Homelessness (Asylum-Seekers) (Interim Period) (England) Order 1999 (S.I. 1999 No. 3126)
 The Courses for Drink-Drive Offenders (Experimental Period) (Termination of Restrictions) Order 1999 (S.I. 1999 No. 3130)
 The European Convention on Cinematographic Co-production (Amendment) Order 1999 (S.I. 1999 No. 3131)
 The Consular Fees (No. 2) Order 1999 (S.I. 1999 No. 3132)
 The Afghanistan (United Nations Sanctions) Order 1999 (S.I. 1999 No. 3133)
 The Afghanistan (United Nations Sanctions) (Channel Islands) Order 1999 (S.I. 1999 No. 3134)
 The Afghanistan (United Nations Sanctions) (Isle of Man) Order 1999 (S.I. 1999 No. 3135)
 The Afghanistan (United Nations Sanctions) (Overseas Territories) Order 1999 (S.I. 1999 No. 3136)
 The Chartered Institute of Patent Agents Order 1999 (S.I. 1999 No. 3137)
 The Maximum Number of Judges Order 1999 (S.I. 1999 No. 3138)
 The Exempt Charities Order 1999 (S.I. 1999 No. 3139)
 The Transfer of Functions (Agriculture and Food) Order 1999 (S.I. 1999 No. 3141)
 The Transfer of Functions (Medicines and Poisons) Order 1999 (S.I. 1999 No. 3142)
 The Transfer of Functions (Road Traffic) Order 1999 (S.I. 1999 No. 3143)
 The Licensing and Registered Clubs (Northern Ireland) Order 1999 (S.I. 1999 No. 3144 (N.I. 10)])
 The Northern Ireland Assembly Commission (Crown Status) Order 1999 (S.I. 1999 No. 3145)
 The Parliamentary Copyright (Northern Ireland Assembly) Order 1999 (S.I. 1999 No. 3146)
 The Welfare Reform and Pensions (Northern Ireland) Order 1999 (S.I. 1999 No. 3147 (N.I. 11)])
 The European Specialist Medical Qualifications Amendment (No. 2) Regulations 1999 (S.I. 1999 No. 3154)
 The Curfew Order (Responsible Officer) Order 1999 (S.I. 1999 No. 3155)
 The Social Security (New Deal Pilot) Regulations 1999 (S.I. 1999 No. 3156)
 The Non-Domestic Rating (Rural Settlements) (England) Order 1999 (S.I. 1999 No. 3158)
 The Occupational Pensions (Revaluation) Order 1999 (S.I. 1999 No. 3159)
 The Habitat (Water Fringe) (Amendment) Regulations 1999 (S.I. 1999 No. 3160)
 The Habitat (Salt-Marsh) (Amendment) Regulations 1999 (S.I. 1999 No. 3161)
 The Wireless Telegraphy (Third Generation Licences) Regulations 1999 (S.I. 1999 No. 3162)
 The Equal Opportunities (Employment Legislation) (Territorial Limits) Regulations 1999 (S.I. 1999 No. 3163)
 The Croydon Community National Health Service Trust (Change of Name) Order 1999 (S.I. 1999 No. 3164)
 The Chemicals (Hazard Information and Packaging for Supply) (Amendment) (No. 2) Regulations 1999 (S.I. 1999 No. 3165)
 The Yugoslavia (Prohibition of Flights) (No. 2) Regulations 1999 (S.I. 1999 No. 3166)
 The Consumer Credit (Total Charge for Credit, Agreements and Advertisements) (Amendment) Regulations 1999 (S.I. 1999 No. 3177)
 The Social Security Act 1998 (Commencement No. 12 and Consequential and Transitional Provisions) Order 1999 (S.I. 1999 No. 3178 (C. 81)])
 The National Health Service (Choice of Medical Practitioner) Amendment Regulations 1999 (S.I. 1999 No. 3179)
 The Telecommunications (Appeals) Regulations 1999 (S.I. 1999 No. 3180)
 The Education (School Day and School Year) (England) Regulations 1999 (S.I. 1999 No. 3181)
 The Novel Foods and Novel Food Ingredients (Amendment) (England) Regulations 1999 (S.I. 1999 No. 3182)
 The Health Act 1999 (Commencement No.1) (Wales) Order 1999 (S.I. 1999 No. 3184 (W.42) (C.82))
 Gorchymyn Deddf Iechyd 1999 (Cychwyniad Rhif 1) (Cymru) 1999 (S.I. 1999 Rhif 3184 (Cy.42) (C.82))
 The General Teaching Council for Wales (Constitution) (Amendment) Regulations 1999 (S.I. 1999 No 3185 (W. 43)])
 Rheoliadau Cyngor Addysgu Cyffredinol Cymru (Cyfansoddiad) (Diwygio) 1999 (S.I. 1999 Rhif 3185 (Cy. 43))
 The Distress for Rent (Amendment) (No. 3) Rules 1999 (S.I. 1999 No. 3186 (L. 27)])
 The Civil Courts (Amendment) (No. 3) Order 1999 (S.I. 1999 No. 3187)
 The Tax Credits (New Deal Pilot Consequential Amendments) (Northern Ireland) Regulations 1999 (S.I. 1999 No. 3188)
 The General Medical Council (Registration (Fees) (Amendment) Regulations) Order of Council 1999 (S.I. 1999 No. 3189)
 The Immigration and Asylum Act 1999 (Commencement No. 1) Order 1999 (S.I. 1999 No. 3190 (C. 83)])
 The Sale of Dogs (Identification Tag) Regulations 1999 (S.I. 1999 No. 3191)
 The Breeding of Dogs (Licensing Records) Regulations 1999 (S.I. 1999 No. 3192)
 The Dangerous Substances and Preparations (Safety) (Consolidation) (Amendment) (No. 2) Regulations 1999 (S.I. 1999 No. 3193)
 The Chemicals (Hazard Information and Packaging for Supply) (Amendment) (No. 3) Regulations 1999 (S.I. 1999 No. 3194)
 The Design Right (Proceedings before Comptroller) (Amendment) Rules 1999 (S.I. 1999 No. 3195)
 The Registered Designs (Amendment) Rules 1999 (S.I. 1999 No. 3196)
 The Patents (Amendment) (No. 2) Rules 1999 (S.I. 1999 No. 3197)
 The Personal and Occupational Pension Schemes (Miscellaneous Amendments) Regulations 1999 (S.I. 1999 No. 3198)

3201-3300

 The Betting and Gaming Duties Act 1981 (Bingo Prize Limit) Order 1999 (S.I. 1999 No. 3205)
 The Merchant Shipping (Registration of Ships, and Tonnage) (Amendment) Regulations 1999 (S.I. 1999 No. 3206)
 The Northern Ireland Act 1998 (Appointed Day) Order 1999 (S.I. 1999 No. 3208 (C. 84)])
 The Northern Ireland Act 1998 (Commencement No. 5) Order 1999 (S.I. 1999 No. 3209 (C. 85)])
 The Merchant Shipping (Radio) (Fishing Vessels) Regulations 1999 (S.I. 1999 No. 3210)
 The Education (Education Standards Etc. Grants) (England) Regulations 1999 (Amendment No. 2) Regulations 1999 (S.I. 1999 No. 3211)
 The Tax Credits (Payment by Employers) Regulations 1999 (S.I. 1999 No. 3219)
 The Petty Sessions Areas (Amendment) Order 1999 (S.I. 1999 No. 3220)
 The Contaminants in Food (Amendment) (England and Wales) Regulations 1999 (S.I. 1999 No. 3221)
 The A41 Trunk Road (Barnet) Red Route Traffic Order 1997 Variation Order 1999 (S.I. 1999 No. 3222)
 The A13 By-pass Trunk Road (Barking and Dagenham and Havering) Red Route (Clearway) Traffic Order 1999 (S.I. 1999 No. 3223)
 The A205 Trunk Road (Lewisham) Red Route Traffic Order 1998 Variation Order 1999 (S.I. 1999 No. 3224)
 The Motor Vehicles (Approval) (Amendment) (No. 2) Regulations 1999 (S.I. 1999 No. 3226)
 The Civil Aviation (Navigation Services Charges) (Fourth Amendment) Regulations 1999 (S.I. 1999 No. 3227)
 The Bank of England (Limit on Fiduciary Note Issue) Order 1999 (S.I. 1999 No. 3228)
 The Public Telecommunication System Designation (Sala Limited) Order 1999 (S.I. 1999 No. 3229)
 The Public Telecommunication System Designation (Thus Limited) Order 1999 (S.I. 1999 No. 3230)
 The Public Telecommunication System Designation (Metromedia Fiber Network UK Limited) Order 1999 (S.I. 1999 No. 3231)
 The Ionising Radiations Regulations 1999 (S.I. 1999 No. 3232)
 The Public Telecommunication System Designation (Rateflame Limited) Order 1999 (S.I. 1999 No. 3233)
 The Public Telecommunication System Designation (Easynet Group plc) Order 1999 (S.I. 1999 No. 3234)
 The Public Telecommunication System Designation (Drive Memory Limited) Order 1999 (S.I. 1999 No. 3235)
 The Public Telecommunication System Designation (Netkonect Communications Limited) Order 1999 (S.I. 1999 No. 3236)
 The Public Telecommunication System Designation (World-Link Inc) Order 1999 (S.I. 1999 No. 3237)
 The Public Telecommunication System Designation (AT & T-Unisource Communications Services (UK) Limited) Order 1999 (S.I. 1999 No. 3238)
 The Public Telecommunication System Designation (Flag Telecom Ireland Limited) Order 1999 (S.I. 1999 No. 3239)
 The Public Telecommunication System Designation (VIA Net Works UK Ltd) Order 1999 (S.I. 1999 No. 3240)
 The Public Telecommunication System Designation (iaxis Limited) Order 1999 (S.I. 1999 No. 3241)
 The Management of Health and Safety at Work Regulations 1999 (S.I. 1999 No. 3242)
 The Wireless Telegraphy (Licence Charges) (Amendment) Regulations 1999 (S.I. 1999 No. 3243)
 The Environmental Protection (Controls on Injurious Substances) Regulations 1999 (S.I. 1999 No. 3244)
 The London Cab (No. 2) Order 1999 (S.I. 1999 No. 3250)
 The Local Government (Best Value) Performance Plans and Reviews Order 1999 (S.I. 1999 No. 3251)
 The Severn Bridges Tolls Order 1999 (S.I. 1999 No. 3252)
 The A1 Trunk Road (Haringey) Red Route(Bus Priority) Experimental Traffic Order 1999 (S.I. 1999 No. 3254)
 The Commonwealth Development Corporation Act 1999 (Appointed Day) Order 1999 (S.I. 1999 No. 3258 (C. 86)])
 The Local Government Pension Scheme (Management and Investment of Funds) (Amendment) Regulations 1999 (S.I. 1999 No. 3259)
 The Civil Aviation (Route Charges for Navigation Services) Regulations 1999 (S.I. 1999 No. 3260)
 The Stamp Duty and Stamp Duty Reserve Tax (Open-ended Investment Companies) (Amendment No. 2) Regulations 1999 (S.I. 1999 No. 3261)
 The Stamp Duty and Stamp Duty Reserve Tax (Investment Exchanges and Clearing Houses) (OM London Exchange Limited) Regulations 1999 (S.I. 1999 No. 3262)
 The Distraint by Collectors (Fees, Costs and Charges) (Stamp Duty Penalties) Regulations 1999 (S.I. 1999 No. 3263)
 The Stamp Duty Reserve Tax (Amendment No. 2) Regulations 1999 (S.I. 1999 No. 3264)
 The Payments to the Churches Conservation Trust Order 1999 (S.I. 1999 No. 3265)
 The Social Fund Maternity and Funeral Expenses (General) Amendment Regulations 1999 (S.I. 1999 No. 3266)
 The General Optical Council (Rules relating to Injury or Disease of the Eye) Order of Council 1999 (S.I. 1999 No. 3267)
 The Civil Aviation (Joint Financing) (Second Amendment) Regulations 1999 (S.I. 1999 No. 3268)
 The Statistics of Trade (Customs and Excise) (Amendment) Regulations 1999 (S.I. 1999 No. 3269)
 The Landfill Tax (Amendment) Regulations 1999 (S.I. 1999 No. 3270)
 The Greater London Authority Act 1999 (Commencement No. 1) Order 1999 (S.I. 1999 No. 3271 (C. 87)])
 The Greater London Authority Act 1999 (Consequential and Transitional Provisions) (Police) order 1999 (S.I. 1999 No. 3272)
 The Scotland Act 1998 (Transitory and Transitional Provisions) (Finance) Amendment Order 1999 (S.I. 1999 No. 3273)
 The Local Government etc. (Scotland) Act 1994 (Exemption from Repeal) (Scotland) Order 1999 (S.I. 1999 No. 3274 (S. 113)])
 The Non-Domestic Rating Contributions (England) (Amendment) Regulations 1999 (S.I. 1999 No. 3275)
 The South Birmingham Mental Health National Health Service Trust (Transfers of Trust Property) Order 1999 (S.I. 1999 No. 3276)
 The Town and Country Planning (Development Plan) (England) Regulations 1999 (S.I. 1999 No. 3280)
 The Merchant Shipping (Seamen's Documents) (Amendment) Regulations 1999 (S.I. 1999 No. 3281)
 The A40 Trunk Road (Western Avenue, London Borough of Ealing) (Prohibition of U-Turn) Order 1999 (S.I. 1999 No. 3282)
 The Sale of Solid Fuel Byelaws (Exemption from Repeal) (Scotland) Order 1999 (S.I. 1999 No. 3283)
 The Special Commissioners (Jurisdiction and Procedure) (Amendment) Regulations 1999 (S.I. 1999 No. 3292)
 The General Commissioners (Jurisdiction and Procedure) (Amendment) Regulations 1999 (S.I. 1999 No. 3293)
 The Special Commissioners (Amendment of the Taxes Management Act 1970) Regulations 1999 (S.I. 1999 No. 3294)
 The Medicines (Pharmacies) (Applications for Registration and Fees) Amendment Regulations 1999 (S.I. 1999 No. 3295)
 The Lord Chancellor's Advisory Committee on Legal Education and Conduct (Provisions on Abolition) Order 1999 (S.I. 1999 No. 3296)
 The Education (Transition to New Framework) (New Schools, Groups and Miscellaneous) Regulations 1999 (Amendment) Regulations 1999 (S.I. 1999 No. 3297)
 The Public Record Office (Fees) (No. 2) Regulations 1999 (S.I. 1999 No. 3298)
 The Legal Advice and Assistance at Police Stations (Remuneration) (Amendment) (No. 2) Regulations 1999 (S.I. 1999 No. 3299)
 The Kirkley Hall College, Ponteland, Northumberland (Dissolution) Order 1999 (S.I. 1999 No. 3300)

3301-3400

 The Public Lending Right Scheme 1982 (Commencement of Variation) (No. 2) Order 1999 (S.I. 1999 No. 3304)
 The Premium Savings Bonds (Amendment) Regulations 1999 (S.I. 1999 No. 3305)
 The Lloyd's Underwriters (Special Reserve Funds) Regulations 1999 (S.I. 1999 No. 3308)
 The Welfare Reform and Pensions Act 1999 (Commencement No. 1) Order 1999 (S.I. 1999 No. 3309 (C. 88)])
 The Passenger Transport Executives (Capital Finance) (Amendment) (England) Order 1999 (S.I. 1999 No. 3310)
 The Registration of Births, Deaths and Marriages (Fees) Order 1999 (S.I. 1999 No. 3311)
 The Maternity and Parental Leave etc. Regulations 1999 (S.I. 1999 No. 3312)
 The Road Traffic (Permitted Parking Area and Special Parking Area) (Borough of Medway) Order 1999 (S.I. 1999 No. 3313)
 The Road Traffic (Permitted Parking Area and Special Parking Area) (County of Kent) (Borough of Gravesham) Order 1999 (S.I. 1999 No. 3314)
 The Hill Livestock (Compensatory Allowances) (Enforcement) Regulations 1999 (S.I. 1999 No. 3315)
 The Hill Livestock (Compensatory Allowances) Regulations 1999 (S.I. 1999 No. 3316)
 The Afghanistan (United Nations Sanctions) (Channel Islands) (Amendment) Order 1999 (S.I. 1999 No. 3317)
 The Afghanistan (United Nations Sanctions) (Isle of Man) (Amendment) Order 1999 (S.I. 1999 No. 3318)
 The Maximum Number of Stipendiary Magistrates Order 1999 (S.I. 1999 No. 3319)
 The Scotland Act 1998 (Agency Arrangements) (Specification) (No. 2) Order 1999 (S.I. 1999 No. 3320)
 The Scotland Act 1998 (Transfer of Functions to the Scottish Ministers etc.) (No. 2) Order 1999 (S.I. 1999 No. 3321)
 The Holders of Hereditary Peerages (Extension of the Franchise) (Transitional Provisions) Order 1999 (S.I. 1999 No. 3322)
 The Transnational Information and Consultation of Employees Regulations 1999 (S.I. 1999 No. 3323)
 The Income Support (General) and Jobseeker's Allowance Amendment (No. 2) Regulations 1999 (S.I. 1999 No. 3324)
 The Coroners (Amendment) Rules 1999 (S.I. 1999 No. 3325)
 The Income Support (General) Amendment (No. 2) Regulations 1999 (S.I. 1999 No. 3329)
 The Double Taxation Relief (Taxes on Income) (Foreign Interest and Dividends) Regulations 1999 (S.I. 1999 No. 3330)
 The Public Telecommunication System Designation (FLAG Atlantic UK Limited) Order 1999 (S.I. 1999 No. 3331)
 The Public Telecommunication System Designation (E.V. Limited) Order 1999 (S.I. 1999 No. 3332)
 The Public Telecommunication System Designation (Pangea Networks (UK) Limited) Order 1999 (S.I. 1999 No. 3333)
 The Public Telecommunication System Designation (Guernsey Telecoms) Order 1999 (S.I. 1999 No. 3334)
 The Public Telecommunication System Designation (Norweb Telecom Limited) Order 1999 (S.I. 1999 No. 3335)
 The Public Telecommunication System Designation (Racal Telecommunications Limited) Order 1999 (S.I. 1999 No.3336)
 The Tir Gofal and Organic Farming (Amendment) (Wales) Regulations 1999 (S.I. 1999 No. 3337 (W.45))
 Rheoliadau Tir Gofal a Ffermio Organig (Diwygio) (Cymru) 1999 (S.I. 1999 Rhif 3337 (Cy.45))
 The Travel Documents (Fees) Regulations 1999 (S.I. 1999 No. 3339)
 The Combined Probation Areas (Bedfordshire) Order 1999 (S.I. 1999 No. 3340)
 The Combined Probation Areas (Staffordshire) Order 1999 (S.I. 1999 No. 3341)
 The Combined Probation Areas (Kent) Order 1999 (S.I. 1999 No. 3342)
 The Combined Probation Areas (Wiltshire) Order 1999 (S.I. 1999 No.3343)
 The Access to Justice Act 1999 (Commencement No. 2 and Transitional Provisions) Order 1999 (S.I. 1999 No. 3344 (C. 89)])
 The Sefton (Parish) Order 1999 (S.I. 1999 No. 3350)
 The Merchant Shipping (Seamen's Wages and Accounts) (Amendment) Regulations 1999 (S.I. 1999 No. 3360)
 The Beef Bones (Amendment) (England) Regulations 1999 (S.I. 1999 No. 3371)
 The Working Time Regulations 1999 (S.I. 1999 No. 3372)
 The Employment Relations Act 1999 (CommencementNo. 3 and Transitional Provision) Order 1999 (S.I. 1999 No. 3374 (C. 90)])
 Employment Rights (Increase of Limits) Order 1999 (S.I. 1999 No. 3375)
 The Greater London Authority Act 1999 (Commencement No. 2) Order 1999 (S.I. 1999 No. 3376 (C. 91)])
 The Legal Advice and Assistance (Scope) (Amendment) Regulations 1999 (S.I. 1999 No. 3377)
 The Legal Aid (Prescribed Panels) (Amendment) Regulations 1999 (S.I. 1999 No. 3378)
 The Non-Domestic Rating (Chargeable Amounts) (England) Regulations 1999 (S.I. 1999 No. 3379)
 The Greater London Authority (Assembly Constituencies and Returning Officers) Order 1999 (S.I. 1999 No. 3380)
 The Peterlee Education Action Zone Order 1999 (S.I. 1999 No. 3381)
 The Easington and Seaham Education Action Zone Order 1999 (S.I. 1999 No. 3382)
 The Dingle Granby Toxteth Education Action Zone Order 1999 (S.I. 1999 No. 3383)
 The Community Learning Partnership Barrow-in-Furness Education Action Zone Order 1999 (S.I. 1999 No. 3384)
 The Sunderland Building Our Future Education Action Zone Order 1999 (S.I. 1999 No. 3385)
 The Learning Together East Cleveland Education Action Zone Order 1999 (S.I. 1999 No. 3386)
 The Wolverhampton Education Action Zone Order 1999 (S.I. 1999 No. 3387)
 The North Gillingham Education Action Zone Order 1999 (S.I. 1999 No. 3388)
 The Rainbow Education Action Zone in Stoke-on-Trent Order 1999 (S.I. 1999 No. 3389)
 The Leigh Park Education Action Zone Order 1999 (S.I. 1999 No. 3390)
 The Ashington Education Action Zone Order 1999 (S.I. 1999 No. 3391)
 The Breaking the Cycle Bridgwater Education Action Zone Order 1999 (S.I. 1999 No. 3392)
 The Bolton Education Action Zone Order 1999 (S.I. 1999 No. 3393)
 The Coventry Millennium Education Action Zone Order 1999 (S.I. 1999 No. 3394)
 The Downham and Bellingham Education Action Zone Order 1999 (S.I. 1999 No. 3395)
 The Epicentre LEAP Ellesmere Port Cheshire Education Action Zone Order 1999 (S.I. 1999 No. 3396)
 The Clacton and Harwich Education Action Zone Order 1999 (S.I. 1999 No. 3397)
 The Challenge for Corby Education Action Zone Order 1999 (S.I. 1999 No. 3398)
 The Action for Learning Partnership, Bedford Education Action Zone Order 1999 (S.I. 1999 No. 3399)
 The Withernsea and Southern Holderness Rural Achievement Education Action Zone Order 1999 (S.I. 1999 No. 3400)

3401-3500

 The Road Traffic (Permitted Parking Area and Special Parking Area) (County of Kent) (District of Thanet) Order 1999 (S.I. 1999 No. 3401)
 The Road Traffic (Permitted Parking Area and Special Parking Area) (County of Kent) (City of Canterbury) Order 1999 (S.I. 1999 No. 3402)
 The Road Traffic (Permitted Parking Area and Special Parking Area) (County of Kent) (Borough of Swale) Order 1999 (S.I. 1999 No. 3403)
 The Road Traffic (Permitted Parking Area and Special Parking Area) (County of Kent) (District of Sevenoaks) Order 1999 (S.I. 1999 No. 3404)
 The Road Traffic (Permitted Parking Area and Special Parking Area) (County of Kent) (Borough of Tunbridge Wells) Order 1999 (S.I. 1999 No. 3405)
 The Wakefield Community Learning Partnership Education Action Zone Order 1999 (S.I. 1999 No. 3406)
 The South Bradford Community Learning Partnership Education Action Zone Order 1999 (S.I. 1999 No. 3407)
 The Speke Garston Excellent Education Action Zone Order 1999 (S.I. 1999 No. 3408)
 The Building Regulations (Amendment) (No. 2) Regulations 1999 (S.I. 1999 No. 3410)
 The Export of Goods (Control) (Amendment No. 6) Order 1999 (S.I. 1999 No. 3411)
 The Gloucester Education Achievement Zone Order 1999 (S.I. 1999 No. 3412)
 The Road Transport (Passenger Vehicles Cabotage) Regulations 1999 (S.I. 1999 No. 3413)
 The Camborne, Pool and Redruth Success Zone Education Action Zone Order 1999 (S.I. 1999 No. 3414)
 The Merger Reference (Universal Foods Corporation and Pointing Holdings Limited) (Interim Provision) (Revocation) Order 1999 (S.I. 1999 No. 3415)
 The A40 Trunk Road (Ealing and Hammersmith & Fulham) Red Route Experimental Traffic Order 1999 Experimental Variation Order 1999 (S.I. 1999 No. 3416)
 The London Borough of Barnet (Trunk Roads) Red Route (Priority Traffic Lanes) Experimental Traffic Order 1999 Revocation Order 1999 (S.I. 1999 No. 3417)
 The A23 Trunk Road (Croydon) Red Route Traffic Order 1999 Experimental Variation Order 1999 (S.I. 1999 No. 3419)
 The Welfare Reform and Pensions Act 1999 (Commencement No. 2) Order 1999 (S.I. 1999 No. 3420 (C. 92)])
 The Food (Animal Products from Belgium) (Emergency Control) (England and Wales) Order 1999 (S.I. 1999 No. 3421)
 The Animal Feedingstuffs from Belgium (Control) (England and Wales) (No. 4) Regulations 1999 (S.I. 1999 No. 3422)
 Local Authorities (Capital Finance) (Amendment) (England) Regulations 1999 (S.I. 1999 No. 3423)
 The Police (Secretary of State's Objectives) (No. 3) Order 1999 (S.I. 1999 No. 3424)
 The Criminal Justice Act 1988 (Commencement No. 13) Order 1999 (S.I. 1999 No. 3425 (C. 93)])
 The Crime and Disorder Act 1998 (Commencement No. 6) Order 1999 (S.I. 1999 No. 3426 (C. 94)])
 The Youth Justice and Criminal Evidence Act 1999 (Commencement No. 1) Order 1999 (S.I. 1999 No. 3427 (C.95)])
 The Plant Protection Products (Amendment) (No. 2) Regulations 1999 (S.I. 1999 No. 3430)
 The Health Development Agency (Establishment and Constitution) Order 1999 (S.I. 1999 No. 3431)
 The Health Development Agency Regulations 1999 (S.I. 1999 No. 3432)
 The Greater London Authority Act 1999 (Commencement No. 3 and Transitional Finance Provisions) Order 1999 (S.I. 1999 No. 3434 (C. 96)])
 The Greater London Authority Act 1999 (Transitional and Consequential Finance Provisions) Order 1999 (S.I. 1999 No. 3435)
 The Local Authorities (Calculation of Council Tax Base) (Amendment–Greater London Authority) Regulations 1999 (S.I. 1999 No. 3437)
 The Local Government Pension Scheme (Amendment etc.) Regulations 1999 (S.I. 1999 No. 3438)
 The Non-Domestic Rating Contributions (Wales) (Amendment) Regulations 1999 (S.I. 1999 No. 3439 (W. 47))
 Rheoliadau Cyfraniadau Ardrethu Annomestig (Cymru) (Diwygio) 1999 (S.I. 1999 Rhif 3439 (Cy. 47))
 The Water Industry Act 1999 (Commencement No. 2) Order 1999 (S.I. 1999 No. 3440 (C. 97)])
 The Water Industry (Charges) (Vulnerable Groups) Regulations 1999 (S.I. 1999 No. 3441)
 The Water Industry (Prescribed Conditions) Regulations 1999 (S.I. 1999 No. 3442)
 The Pet Travel Scheme (Pilot Arrangements) (England) Order 1999 (S.I. 1999 No. 3443)
 The Workington Harbour Revision Order 1999 (S.I. 1999 No. 3444)
 The Harbour Works (Environmental Impact Assessment) Regulations 1999 (S.I. 1999 No. 3445)
 The Registration of Restrictive Trading Agreements (Amendment) Regulations 1999 (S.I. 1999 No. 3446)
 The Producer Responsibility Obligations (Packaging Waste) (Amendment) (No. 2) Regulations 1999 (S.I. 1999 No. 3447)
 The Telecommunications (Interconnection) (Carrier Pre-selection) Regulations 1999 (S.I. 1999 No. 3448)
 The Telecommunications (Interconnection) (Number Portability, etc.) Regulations 1999 (S.I. 1999 No. 3449)
 The National Health Service Trusts (Wales) (Dissolution No. 2) Order 1999 (S.I. 1999 No. 3450 (W. 48))
 Gorchymyn Ymddiriedolaethau'r Gwasanaeth Iechyd Gwladol (Cymru) (Diddymu Rhif 2) 1999 (S.I. 1999 Rhif 3450 (Cy. 48))
 The Cardiff and Vale National Health Service Trust Establishment Order 1999 (S.I. 1999 No. 3451 (W.49))
 Gorchymyn Sefydlu Ymddiriedolaeth Gwasanaeth Iechyd Gwladol Caerdydd a'r Fro 1999 (S.I. 1999 Rhif 3451 (Cy.49))
 The Copyright (Certification of Licensing Scheme for Educational Recording of Broadcasts and Cable Programmes) (Educational Recording Agency Limited) (Amendment) Order 1999 (S.I. 1999 No. 3452)
 The Central Rating List (Wales) Regulations 1999 (S.I. 1999 No. 3453 (W.50))
 Rheoliadau Rhestr Ardrethu Canolog (Cymru) 1999 (S.I. 1999 Rhif 3453 (Cy.50))
 The Non-Domestic Rating (Chargeable Amounts) (Wales) Regulations 1999 (S.I. 1999 No. 3454 (W.51))
 Rheoliadau Ardrethu Annomestig (Symiau y Gellir eu Codi) (Cymru) 1999 (S.I. 1999 Rhif 3454 (Cy.51))
 The Local Authorities (Funds) (England) (Amendment No. 2) Regulations 1999 (S.I. 1999 No. 3459)
 The Dental Auxiliaries (Amendment) Regulations 1999 (S.I. 1999 No. 3460)
 The Veterinary Surgeons and Veterinary Practitioners (Registration) (Amendment) Regulations Order of Council 1999 (S.I. 1999 No. 3461)
 The Land Registration (No. 3) Rules 1999 (S.I. 1999 No. 3462)
 The Prescription Only Medicines (Human Use) Amendment (No. 2) Order 1999 (S.I. 1999 No. 3463)
 The Beef Bones (Amendment) (Wales) Regulations 1999 (S.I. 1999 No. 3464 (W.52))
 Rheoliadau Esgyrn Cig Eidion (Diwygio) (Cymru) 1999 (S.I. 1999 Rhif 3464 (Cy.52))
 The Housing Accommodation (Persons Subject to Immigration Control) (Amendment) (Wales) Order 1999 (S.I. 1999 No. 3465 (W53))
 Gorchymyn Cartrefi i Bobl Fyw Ynddynt (Personau sy'n Ddarostyngedig i Reolaeth Fewnfudo) (Diwygio) (Cymru) 1999 (S.I. 1999 Rhif 3465 (Cy.53))
 The Northern Birmingham Community Health and the Southern Birmingham Community Health National Health Service Trusts (Dissolution) Order 1999 (S.I. 1999 No. 3466)
 The Birmingham Specialist Community Health National Health Service Trust (Establishment) Order 1999 (S.I. 1999 No. 3467)
 The Housing Renewal Grants (Amendment) (Wales) Regulations 1999 (S.I. 1999 No. 3468 (W.54))
 Rheoliadau Grantiau Adnewyddu Tai (Diwygio) (Cymru) 1999 (S.I. 1999 Rhif 3468 (Cy.54))
 The Relocation Grants (Form of Application) and (Welsh Form of Application) (Amendment) (Wales) Regulations 1999 (S.I. 1999 No. 3469 (W.55))
 Rheoliadau Grantiau Adleoli (Ffurflen Gais) a (Ffurflen Gais Gymraeg) (Diwygio) (Cymru) 1999 (S.I. 1999 Rhif 3469 (Cy.55))
 The Housing Renewal Grants (Prescribed Form and Particulars) and (Welsh Form and Particulars) (Amendment) (Wales) Regulations 1999 (S.I. 1999 No. 3470 (W.56))
 Rheoliadau Grantiau Adnewyddu Tai (Ffurflen a Manylion a Ragnodir) a (Ffurflen a Manylion Cymraeg) (Diwygio) (Cymru) 1999 (S.I. 1999 Rhif 3470 (Cy.56))
 The Alexandra Health Care, the Kidderminster Health Care, the Worcestershire Community Healthcare and the Worcester Royal Infirmary National Health Service Trusts (Dissolution) Order 1999 (S.I. 1999 No. 3471)
 The Worcestershire Community and Mental Health National Health Service Trust (Establishment) Order 1999 (S.I. 1999 No. 3472)
 The Worcestershire Acute Hospitals National Health Service Trust (Establishment) Order 1999 (S.I. 1999 No. 3473)
 The Pesticides (Maximum Residue Levels in Crops, Food and Feeding Stuffs) (England and Wales) Regulations 1999 (S.I. 1999 No. 3483)
 The Family Proceedings (Amendment No. 2) Rules 1999 (S.I. 1999 No. 3491 (L. 28))

External links
Legislation.gov.uk delivered by the UK National Archive
UK SI's on legislation.gov.uk
UK Draft SI's on legislation.gov.uk

See also
List of Statutory Instruments of the United Kingdom

Lists of Statutory Instruments of the United Kingdom
Statutory Instruments